This is a partial list of unnumbered minor planets for principal provisional designations assigned during 16–31 March 2004. , a total of 465 bodies remain unnumbered for this period. Objects for this year are listed on the following pages: A–B · C · D–E · F · G–H · J–O · P–Q · Ri · Rii · Riii · S · Ti · Tii · Tiii · Tiv · U–V · W–X and Y. Also see previous and next year.

F 

|- id="2004 FA" bgcolor=#FFC2E0
| 5 || 2004 FA || APO || 23.2 || data-sort-value="0.081" | 81 m || single || 10 days || 25 Mar 2004 || 132 || align=left | Disc.: Spacewatch || 
|- id="2004 FB" bgcolor=#FA8072
| 1 || 2004 FB || MCA || 19.6 || data-sort-value="0.67" | 670 m || multiple || 2004–2018 || 16 May 2018 || 96 || align=left | Disc.: CSS || 
|- id="2004 FC" bgcolor=#FA8072
| – || 2004 FC || MCA || 21.8 || data-sort-value="0.13" | 130 m || single || 28 days || 13 Apr 2004 || 23 || align=left | Disc.: Spacewatch || 
|- id="2004 FD" bgcolor=#FFC2E0
| 5 || 2004 FD || APO || 22.9 || data-sort-value="0.093" | 93 m || multiple || 2004–2007 || 11 Mar 2007 || 43 || align=left | Disc.: Spacewatch || 
|- id="2004 FE" bgcolor=#FFC2E0
| 5 || 2004 FE || AMO || 21.9 || data-sort-value="0.15" | 150 m || single || 61 days || 13 Apr 2004 || 45 || align=left | Disc.: LINEAR || 
|- id="2004 FH" bgcolor=#FFC2E0
| 1 || 2004 FH || ATE || 25.7 || data-sort-value="0.026" | 26 m || multiple || 2004–2018 || 16 Jan 2018 || 251 || align=left | Disc.: LINEAR || 
|- id="2004 FC1" bgcolor=#fefefe
| 1 ||  || MBA-I || 18.4 || data-sort-value="0.62" | 620 m || multiple || 2005–2020 || 12 Jul 2020 || 28 || align=left | Disc.: VATT || 
|- id="2004 FE1" bgcolor=#FA8072
| 1 ||  || MCA || 19.5 || data-sort-value="0.37" | 370 m || multiple || 2004–2020 || 20 Oct 2020 || 81 || align=left | Disc.: LPL/Spacewatch IIAlt.: 2013 EN23 || 
|- id="2004 FN1" bgcolor=#d6d6d6
| 0 ||  || MBA-O || 16.82 || 2.4 km || multiple || 2004–2020 || 18 Aug 2020 || 162 || align=left | Disc.: LINEARAlt.: 2019 AH6 || 
|- id="2004 FR1" bgcolor=#fefefe
| 1 ||  || HUN || 18.88 || data-sort-value="0.50" | 500 m || multiple || 2004–2021 || 01 Apr 2021 || 65 || align=left | Disc.: SpacewatchAdded on 9 March 2021 || 
|- id="2004 FW1" bgcolor=#FFC2E0
| 1 ||  || APO || 20.9 || data-sort-value="0.23" | 230 m || multiple || 2004–2018 || 10 Dec 2018 || 121 || align=left | Disc.: LINEARPotentially hazardous objectAlt.: 2016 UD57 || 
|- id="2004 FX1" bgcolor=#FFC2E0
| 8 ||  || APO || 25.3 || data-sort-value="0.031" | 31 m || single || 2 days || 19 Mar 2004 || 28 || align=left | Disc.: LINEAR || 
|- id="2004 FY1" bgcolor=#FFC2E0
| 6 ||  || APO || 26.3 || data-sort-value="0.020" | 20 m || single || 2 days || 19 Mar 2004 || 19 || align=left | Disc.: LINEAR || 
|- id="2004 FK2" bgcolor=#FFC2E0
| 7 ||  || AMO || 24.3 || data-sort-value="0.049" | 49 m || single || 12 days || 29 Mar 2004 || 65 || align=left | Disc.: LINEAR || 
|- id="2004 FV2" bgcolor=#fefefe
| – ||  || MBA-I || 18.4 || data-sort-value="0.62" | 620 m || single || 9 days || 27 Mar 2004 || 18 || align=left | Disc.: LINEAR || 
|- id="2004 FH3" bgcolor=#d6d6d6
| 0 ||  || MBA-O || 16.87 || 2.4 km || multiple || 2004–2021 || 04 Aug 2021 || 118 || align=left | Disc.: VATTAlt.: 2009 DZ63 || 
|- id="2004 FJ3" bgcolor=#d6d6d6
| 0 ||  || MBA-O || 17.12 || 2.1 km || multiple || 2001–2021 || 09 Aug 2021 || 61 || align=left | Disc.: VATTAlt.: 2016 PF34 || 
|- id="2004 FY3" bgcolor=#FFC2E0
| 7 ||  || APO || 25.4 || data-sort-value="0.030" | 30 m || single || 11 days || 30 Mar 2004 || 27 || align=left | Disc.: LINEAR || 
|- id="2004 FC4" bgcolor=#d6d6d6
| 0 ||  || MBA-O || 16.59 || 2.7 km || multiple || 2004–2021 || 07 Apr 2021 || 107 || align=left | Disc.: Valmeca Obs. || 
|- id="2004 FD4" bgcolor=#FFC2E0
| 1 ||  || AMO || 21.1 || data-sort-value="0.21" | 210 m || multiple || 2004–2020 || 14 Oct 2020 || 36 || align=left | Disc.: LPL/Spacewatch II || 
|- id="2004 FE4" bgcolor=#FFC2E0
| 8 ||  || AMO || 23.3 || data-sort-value="0.078" | 78 m || single || 11 days || 30 Mar 2004 || 38 || align=left | Disc.: LINEAR || 
|- id="2004 FM4" bgcolor=#FFC2E0
| 8 ||  || APO || 25.1 || data-sort-value="0.034" | 34 m || single || 12 days || 31 Mar 2004 || 26 || align=left | Disc.: LINEAR || 
|- id="2004 FP4" bgcolor=#FFC2E0
| 4 ||  || AMO || 23.1 || data-sort-value="0.085" | 85 m || single || 121 days || 19 Jul 2004 || 71 || align=left | Disc.: LINEAR || 
|- id="2004 FA5" bgcolor=#FFC2E0
| 7 ||  || APO || 24.5 || data-sort-value="0.045" | 45 m || single || 5 days || 24 Mar 2004 || 24 || align=left | Disc.: LINEAR || 
|- id="2004 FC5" bgcolor=#FA8072
| 1 ||  || HUN || 18.4 || data-sort-value="0.62" | 620 m || multiple || 2004–2017 || 23 Apr 2017 || 43 || align=left | Disc.: SpacewatchAlt.: 2015 VQ48 || 
|- id="2004 FJ5" bgcolor=#fefefe
| 0 ||  || MBA-I || 18.1 || data-sort-value="0.71" | 710 m || multiple || 2004–2020 || 16 Dec 2020 || 108 || align=left | Disc.: VATT || 
|- id="2004 FK5" bgcolor=#FFC2E0
| 6 ||  || APO || 26.8 || data-sort-value="0.016" | 16 m || single || 3 days || 25 Mar 2004 || 17 || align=left | Disc.: LINEARAMO at MPC || 
|- id="2004 FL5" bgcolor=#fefefe
| 0 ||  || HUN || 18.27 || data-sort-value="0.66" | 660 m || multiple || 2004–2021 || 08 Nov 2021 || 119 || align=left | Disc.: LINEARAlt.: 2012 FQ73 || 
|- id="2004 FW5" bgcolor=#FA8072
| 0 ||  || MCA || 19.31 || data-sort-value="0.41" | 410 m || multiple || 2001–2021 || 09 Sep 2021 || 128 || align=left | Disc.: LINEAR || 
|- id="2004 FZ5" bgcolor=#FFC2E0
| 0 ||  || AMO || 20.05 || data-sort-value="0.43" | 350 m || multiple || 2004–2023 || 18 Mar 2023 || 86 || align=left | Disc.: LINEAR || 
|- id="2004 FJ6" bgcolor=#fefefe
| 0 ||  || MBA-I || 17.6 || data-sort-value="0.90" | 900 m || multiple || 2004–2020 || 10 Dec 2020 || 74 || align=left | Disc.: LINEAR || 
|- id="2004 FQ6" bgcolor=#d6d6d6
| 0 ||  || MBA-O || 16.77 || 2.5 km || multiple || 2004–2021 || 14 Apr 2021 || 67 || align=left | Disc.: LPL/Spacewatch IIAdded on 22 July 2020Alt.: 2012 QB28 || 
|- id="2004 FR6" bgcolor=#d6d6d6
| 0 ||  || MBA-O || 16.6 || 2.7 km || multiple || 2004–2020 || 16 Mar 2020 || 44 || align=left | Disc.: LPL/Spacewatch II || 
|- id="2004 FS6" bgcolor=#FA8072
| 0 ||  || MCA || 18.74 || data-sort-value="0.75" | 750 m || multiple || 2004–2021 || 08 Apr 2021 || 27 || align=left | Disc.: LPL/Spacewatch IIAdded on 11 May 2021 || 
|- id="2004 FY6" bgcolor=#fefefe
| 2 ||  || MBA-I || 18.9 || data-sort-value="0.49" | 490 m || multiple || 2004–2018 || 20 Jan 2018 || 34 || align=left | Disc.: LPL/Spacewatch IIAlt.: 2015 KR63 || 
|- id="2004 FZ6" bgcolor=#d6d6d6
| 0 ||  || MBA-O || 17.6 || 1.7 km || multiple || 2004–2020 || 22 Mar 2020 || 37 || align=left | Disc.: LPL/Spacewatch IIAlt.: 2009 BS190 || 
|- id="2004 FA7" bgcolor=#fefefe
| 0 ||  || MBA-I || 17.87 || data-sort-value="0.79" | 790 m || multiple || 2002–2022 || 24 Jan 2022 || 84 || align=left | Disc.: SDSSAlt.: 2002 TS371 || 
|- id="2004 FL7" bgcolor=#fefefe
| 3 ||  || MBA-I || 19.4 || data-sort-value="0.39" | 390 m || multiple || 2004–2020 || 15 Oct 2020 || 23 || align=left | Disc.: LPL/Spacewatch II || 
|- id="2004 FM8" bgcolor=#fefefe
| 2 ||  || HUN || 18.4 || data-sort-value="0.62" | 620 m || multiple || 2004–2020 || 15 Sep 2020 || 27 || align=left | Disc.: SpacewatchAlt.: 2015 VZ48 || 
|- id="2004 FN8" bgcolor=#FFC2E0
| 6 ||  || APO || 27.1 || data-sort-value="0.014" | 14 m || single || 6 days || 29 Mar 2004 || 27 || align=left | Disc.: LINEAR || 
|- id="2004 FK9" bgcolor=#E9E9E9
| 0 ||  || MBA-M || 17.9 || 1.1 km || multiple || 2004–2021 || 17 Jan 2021 || 54 || align=left | Disc.: LPL/Spacewatch II || 
|- id="2004 FM9" bgcolor=#E9E9E9
| 0 ||  || MBA-M || 17.88 || 1.1 km || multiple || 2004–2021 || 14 Apr 2021 || 51 || align=left | Disc.: LPL/Spacewatch II || 
|- id="2004 FN9" bgcolor=#E9E9E9
| 0 ||  || MBA-M || 17.2 || 1.5 km || multiple || 2001–2021 || 07 Jan 2021 || 99 || align=left | Disc.: LPL/Spacewatch IIAlt.: 2015 VS90 || 
|- id="2004 FQ9" bgcolor=#d6d6d6
| 0 ||  || HIL || 16.5 || 2.8 km || multiple || 2004–2021 || 09 May 2021 || 28 || align=left | Disc.: LPL/Spacewatch IIAdded on 19 October 2020 || 
|- id="2004 FR9" bgcolor=#E9E9E9
| 2 ||  || MBA-M || 18.8 || data-sort-value="0.52" | 520 m || multiple || 2004–2016 || 28 Mar 2016 || 25 || align=left | Disc.: LPL/Spacewatch IIAdded on 22 July 2020 || 
|- id="2004 FY9" bgcolor=#E9E9E9
| 0 ||  || MBA-M || 18.47 || data-sort-value="0.85" | 850 m || multiple || 2004–2021 || 06 Apr 2021 || 69 || align=left | Disc.: CINEOSAlt.: 2017 FZ99 || 
|- id="2004 FO10" bgcolor=#E9E9E9
| 0 ||  || MBA-M || 16.94 || 2.3 km || multiple || 2004–2022 || 26 Jan 2022 || 149 || align=left | Disc.: SpacewatchAlt.: 2015 OL18 || 
|- id="2004 FY10" bgcolor=#fefefe
| 1 ||  || MBA-I || 18.4 || data-sort-value="0.62" | 620 m || multiple || 2004–2021 || 07 Jun 2021 || 65 || align=left | Disc.: LPL/Spacewatch IIAdded on 17 June 2021Alt.: 2011 HF37, 2015 PB300, 2021 GZ54 || 
|- id="2004 FZ10" bgcolor=#E9E9E9
| 0 ||  || MBA-M || 18.03 || data-sort-value="0.74" | 740 m || multiple || 2004–2021 || 07 Apr 2021 || 59 || align=left | Disc.: LPL/Spacewatch II || 
|- id="2004 FJ11" bgcolor=#FFC2E0
| 0 ||  || APO || 21.03 || data-sort-value="0.22" | 220 m || multiple || 2004–2021 || 30 Sep 2021 || 171 || align=left | Disc.: LINEARPotentially hazardous object || 
|- id="2004 FN12" bgcolor=#d6d6d6
| 0 ||  || MBA-O || 16.70 || 2.5 km || multiple || 2004–2021 || 15 Jun 2021 || 86 || align=left | Disc.: Junk Bond Obs.Alt.: 2015 FX269 || 
|- id="2004 FR15" bgcolor=#E9E9E9
| 0 ||  || MBA-M || 17.07 || 1.6 km || multiple || 2000–2021 || 12 Jun 2021 || 104 || align=left | Disc.: SpacewatchAlt.: 2000 KC82 || 
|- id="2004 FX15" bgcolor=#fefefe
| 1 ||  || HUN || 18.1 || data-sort-value="0.71" | 710 m || multiple || 2004–2020 || 16 Oct 2020 || 92 || align=left | Disc.: LINEARAlt.: 2015 TA21 || 
|- id="2004 FY15" bgcolor=#FFC2E0
| 6 ||  || APO || 26.1 || data-sort-value="0.021" | 21 m || single || 1 day || 27 Mar 2004 || 28 || align=left | Disc.: CSS  || 
|- id="2004 FB16" bgcolor=#FFC2E0
| 8 ||  || AMO || 25.5 || data-sort-value="0.028" | 28 m || single || 7 days || 30 Mar 2004 || 21 || align=left | Disc.: LINEAR || 
|- id="2004 FJ16" bgcolor=#fefefe
| 0 ||  || MBA-I || 17.3 || 1.0 km || multiple || 2004–2019 || 25 Oct 2019 || 84 || align=left | Disc.: LINEAR || 
|- id="2004 FP16" bgcolor=#fefefe
| 7 ||  || MBA-I || 19.3 || data-sort-value="0.41" | 410 m || multiple || 2004–2015 || 25 May 2015 || 8 || align=left | Disc.: Mauna Kea Obs. || 
|- id="2004 FS16" bgcolor=#E9E9E9
| 2 ||  || MBA-M || 18.81 || data-sort-value="0.51" | 510 m || multiple || 2004–2021 || 13 Jul 2021 || 29 || align=left | Disc.: Mauna Kea Obs.Added on 21 August 2021Alt.: 2021 LJ8 || 
|- id="2004 FT16" bgcolor=#d6d6d6
| 2 ||  || MBA-O || 17.2 || 2.0 km || multiple || 2004–2018 || 30 Sep 2018 || 37 || align=left | Disc.: Mauna Kea Obs.Alt.: 2013 UK30 || 
|- id="2004 FZ16" bgcolor=#E9E9E9
| 0 ||  || MBA-M || 18.1 || data-sort-value="0.71" | 710 m || multiple || 2004–2021 || 13 May 2021 || 52 || align=left | Disc.: Mauna Kea Obs.Added on 17 June 2021Alt.: 2021 GX39 || 
|- id="2004 FF17" bgcolor=#d6d6d6
| 1 ||  || MBA-O || 17.0 || 2.2 km || multiple || 2004–2018 || 04 Oct 2018 || 27 || align=left | Disc.: Mauna Kea Obs.Added on 22 July 2020 || 
|- id="2004 FN17" bgcolor=#FFC2E0
| 1 ||  || AMO || 21.0 || data-sort-value="0.22" | 220 m || multiple || 2004–2006 || 29 Jan 2006 || 71 || align=left | Disc.: LINEAR || 
|- id="2004 FW17" bgcolor=#FA8072
| – ||  || MCA || 19.1 || data-sort-value="0.45" | 450 m || single || 55 days || 21 May 2004 || 43 || align=left | Disc.: LINEAR || 
|- id="2004 FB18" bgcolor=#FFC2E0
| 6 ||  || AMO || 24.0 || data-sort-value="0.056" | 56 m || single || 57 days || 24 May 2004 || 72 || align=left | Disc.: LINEAR || 
|- id="2004 FC18" bgcolor=#FFC2E0
| 8 ||  || APO || 24.4 || data-sort-value="0.047" | 47 m || single || 5 days || 01 Apr 2004 || 39 || align=left | Disc.: Spacewatch || 
|- id="2004 FQ18" bgcolor=#fefefe
| 0 ||  || MBA-I || 19.28 || data-sort-value="0.41" | 410 m || multiple || 2004–2019 || 08 May 2019 || 40 || align=left | Disc.: Kitt Peak || 
|- id="2004 FU18" bgcolor=#d6d6d6
| 2 ||  || MBA-O || 17.6 || 1.7 km || multiple || 2004–2020 || 24 Mar 2020 || 30 || align=left | Disc.: Kitt PeakAdded on 22 July 2020 || 
|- id="2004 FE20" bgcolor=#E9E9E9
| 0 ||  || MBA-M || 17.72 || 1.6 km || multiple || 2004–2022 || 07 Jan 2022 || 78 || align=left | Disc.: LINEAR || 
|- id="2004 FC22" bgcolor=#d6d6d6
| 0 ||  || MBA-O || 16.92 || 2.3 km || multiple || 2004–2021 || 29 Aug 2021 || 150 || align=left | Disc.: LPL/Spacewatch IIAlt.: 2010 HR24 || 
|- id="2004 FX22" bgcolor=#E9E9E9
| 0 ||  || MBA-M || 16.83 || 1.8 km || multiple || 2004–2021 || 07 Apr 2021 || 282 || align=left | Disc.: SpacewatchAlt.: 2013 GP89 || 
|- id="2004 FC25" bgcolor=#fefefe
| 0 ||  || MBA-I || 18.2 || data-sort-value="0.68" | 680 m || multiple || 2004–2020 || 08 Dec 2020 || 107 || align=left | Disc.: SpacewatchAlt.: 2011 EM21, 2015 KG106 || 
|- id="2004 FE25" bgcolor=#E9E9E9
| 0 ||  || MBA-M || 18.1 || data-sort-value="0.71" | 710 m || multiple || 2000–2021 || 19 May 2021 || 72 || align=left | Disc.: SpacewatchAdded on 17 June 2021 || 
|- id="2004 FC29" bgcolor=#FA8072
| 3 ||  || MCA || 19.2 || data-sort-value="0.80" | 800 m || multiple || 2004–2015 || 28 Mar 2015 || 46 || align=left | Disc.: Spacewatch || 
|- id="2004 FF29" bgcolor=#FFC2E0
| 0 ||  || APO || 18.1 || data-sort-value="0.85" | 850 m || multiple || 2004–2020 || 24 Jun 2020 || 724 || align=left | Disc.: Črni Vrh Obs.NEO larger than 1 kilometer || 
|- id="2004 FG29" bgcolor=#FFC2E0
| 8 ||  || ATE || 26.0 || data-sort-value="0.022" | 22 m || single || 2 days || 31 Mar 2004 || 45 || align=left | Disc.: LINEAR || 
|- id="2004 FH29" bgcolor=#FFC2E0
| 4 ||  || APO || 24.0 || data-sort-value="0.056" | 56 m || single || 11 days || 09 Apr 2004 || 56 || align=left | Disc.: SSS || 
|- id="2004 FS29" bgcolor=#fefefe
| E ||  || MBA-I || 20.3 || data-sort-value="0.26" | 260 m || single || 2 days || 28 Mar 2004 || 6 || align=left | Disc.: Berg. Gladbach || 
|- id="2004 FA30" bgcolor=#fefefe
| 0 ||  || MBA-I || 16.9 || 1.2 km || multiple || 2004–2021 || 09 Jan 2021 || 263 || align=left | Disc.: NEATAlt.: 2011 EG79, 2011 GF71 || 
|- id="2004 FL30" bgcolor=#FA8072
| 1 ||  || HUN || 18.1 || data-sort-value="0.71" | 710 m || multiple || 2004–2019 || 25 Jan 2019 || 65 || align=left | Disc.: LINEAR || 
|- id="2004 FJ31" bgcolor=#FFC2E0
| – ||  || APO || 24.4 || data-sort-value="0.047" | 47 m || single || 2 days || 31 Mar 2004 || 24 || align=left | Disc.: LINEAR || 
|- id="2004 FK31" bgcolor=#fefefe
| 0 ||  || MBA-I || 18.26 || data-sort-value="0.66" | 660 m || multiple || 2004–2021 || 13 Apr 2021 || 144 || align=left | Disc.: Tenagra II Obs. || 
|- id="2004 FY31" bgcolor=#FFC2E0
| 6 ||  || APO || 21.9 || data-sort-value="0.15" | 150 m || single || 57 days || 14 Apr 2004 || 56 || align=left | Disc.: LONEOSPotentially hazardous object || 
|- id="2004 FM32" bgcolor=#FFC2E0
| 6 ||  || APO || 27.1 || data-sort-value="0.014" | 14 m || single || 15 days || 14 Apr 2004 || 35 || align=left | Disc.: LINEAR || 
|- id="2004 FZ35" bgcolor=#E9E9E9
| 0 ||  || MBA-M || 18.43 || data-sort-value="0.87" | 870 m || multiple || 2004–2021 || 30 Apr 2021 || 43 || align=left | Disc.: LPL/Spacewatch II || 
|- id="2004 FE37" bgcolor=#fefefe
| 0 ||  || MBA-I || 17.8 || data-sort-value="0.82" | 820 m || multiple || 2000–2019 || 29 Sep 2019 || 61 || align=left | Disc.: CINEOSAlt.: 2011 DJ41 || 
|- id="2004 FU39" bgcolor=#fefefe
| 0 ||  || HUN || 17.89 || data-sort-value="0.79" | 790 m || multiple || 2004–2021 || 14 May 2021 || 222 || align=left | Disc.: LINEAR || 
|- id="2004 FP40" bgcolor=#fefefe
| 0 ||  || MBA-I || 17.2 || 1.1 km || multiple || 1997–2021 || 07 Jan 2021 || 176 || align=left | Disc.: LINEARAlt.: 2011 DK34 || 
|- id="2004 FV43" bgcolor=#d6d6d6
| 0 ||  || MBA-O || 16.21 || 3.2 km || multiple || 2004–2021 || 10 May 2021 || 106 || align=left | Disc.: LINEARAlt.: 2010 MF65, 2015 AJ15 || 
|- id="2004 FB48" bgcolor=#fefefe
| 0 ||  || MBA-I || 18.2 || data-sort-value="0.68" | 680 m || multiple || 2004–2021 || 09 Jan 2021 || 91 || align=left | Disc.: LINEARAlt.: 2015 PE77 || 
|- id="2004 FM52" bgcolor=#E9E9E9
| 0 ||  || MBA-M || 18.86 || data-sort-value="0.71" | 710 m || multiple || 2004–2021 || 08 May 2021 || 55 || align=left | Disc.: LINEARAlt.: 2021 EO28 || 
|- id="2004 FK54" bgcolor=#d6d6d6
| 0 ||  || MBA-O || 17.0 || 2.2 km || multiple || 2004–2020 || 25 May 2020 || 89 || align=left | Disc.: Spacewatch || 
|- id="2004 FA57" bgcolor=#d6d6d6
| 0 ||  || MBA-O || 16.91 || 2.3 km || multiple || 2004–2021 || 09 May 2021 || 65 || align=left | Disc.: Spacewatch || 
|- id="2004 FE57" bgcolor=#fefefe
| – ||  || MBA-I || 19.4 || data-sort-value="0.39" | 390 m || single || 6 days || 23 Mar 2004 || 9 || align=left | Disc.: Spacewatch || 
|- id="2004 FL57" bgcolor=#fefefe
| 2 ||  || MBA-I || 18.8 || data-sort-value="0.52" | 520 m || multiple || 2004–2019 || 26 Apr 2019 || 31 || align=left | Disc.: SpacewatchAlt.: 2015 ED22 || 
|- id="2004 FW57" bgcolor=#fefefe
| 0 ||  || MBA-I || 18.56 || data-sort-value="0.58" | 580 m || multiple || 2004–2021 || 03 Aug 2021 || 88 || align=left | Disc.: Spacewatch || 
|- id="2004 FQ58" bgcolor=#fefefe
| 0 ||  || MBA-I || 18.2 || data-sort-value="0.68" | 680 m || multiple || 1997–2021 || 18 Jan 2021 || 61 || align=left | Disc.: Spacewatch || 
|- id="2004 FS58" bgcolor=#fefefe
| 0 ||  || MBA-I || 18.45 || data-sort-value="0.61" | 610 m || multiple || 2004–2022 || 25 Jan 2022 || 87 || align=left | Disc.: SpacewatchAlt.: 2015 CM24 || 
|- id="2004 FT58" bgcolor=#FA8072
| – ||  || MCA || 20.2 || data-sort-value="0.51" | 510 m || single || 6 days || 23 Mar 2004 || 9 || align=left | Disc.: Spacewatch || 
|- id="2004 FA59" bgcolor=#E9E9E9
| 4 ||  || MBA-M || 18.1 || 1.0 km || multiple || 2004–2017 || 29 Mar 2017 || 21 || align=left | Disc.: SpacewatchAdded on 24 December 2021 || 
|- id="2004 FF60" bgcolor=#E9E9E9
| 0 ||  || MBA-M || 17.4 || 1.4 km || multiple || 2004–2020 || 17 Dec 2020 || 74 || align=left | Disc.: SpacewatchAlt.: 2007 YA10 || 
|- id="2004 FL60" bgcolor=#d6d6d6
| 0 ||  || MBA-O || 16.45 || 2.9 km || multiple || 2001–2021 || 07 Jul 2021 || 209 || align=left | Disc.: SpacewatchAlt.: 2009 CG19, 2014 AC31, 2015 FS234 || 
|- id="2004 FJ61" bgcolor=#fefefe
| 0 ||  || MBA-I || 18.32 || data-sort-value="0.64" | 640 m || multiple || 1993–2022 || 07 Jan 2022 || 99 || align=left | Disc.: LINEAR || 
|- id="2004 FD67" bgcolor=#E9E9E9
| 0 ||  || MBA-M || 17.11 || 1.6 km || multiple || 2004–2021 || 02 Apr 2021 || 161 || align=left | Disc.: LINEARAlt.: 2015 TU96, 2017 FQ135 || 
|- id="2004 FK67" bgcolor=#fefefe
| 0 ||  || MBA-I || 17.8 || data-sort-value="0.82" | 820 m || multiple || 1997–2020 || 10 Dec 2020 || 88 || align=left | Disc.: LINEARAlt.: 2015 LS40 || 
|- id="2004 FR68" bgcolor=#d6d6d6
| 0 ||  || MBA-O || 17.10 || 2.1 km || multiple || 2004–2021 || 01 May 2021 || 65 || align=left | Disc.: SDSSAdded on 19 October 2020Alt.: 2010 NC111, 2015 ET50, 2016 NB3 || 
|- id="2004 FY68" bgcolor=#fefefe
| 2 ||  || MBA-I || 18.6 || data-sort-value="0.57" | 570 m || multiple || 2004–2019 || 25 Apr 2019 || 41 || align=left | Disc.: SpacewatchAlt.: 2015 BO470 || 
|- id="2004 FH70" bgcolor=#E9E9E9
| 0 ||  || MBA-M || 17.32 || 1.4 km || multiple || 2002–2021 || 08 Apr 2021 || 156 || align=left | Disc.: Valmeca Obs.Alt.: 2015 VE126, 2017 FU184 || 
|- id="2004 FU70" bgcolor=#d6d6d6
| 0 ||  || MBA-O || 16.7 || 2.5 km || multiple || 2004–2018 || 10 Oct 2018 || 42 || align=left | Disc.: SpacewatchAlt.: 2015 BN390 || 
|- id="2004 FX70" bgcolor=#fefefe
| 0 ||  || MBA-I || 18.4 || data-sort-value="0.62" | 620 m || multiple || 2004–2019 || 27 Sep 2019 || 59 || align=left | Disc.: SpacewatchAlt.: 2004 FN164 || 
|- id="2004 FG71" bgcolor=#d6d6d6
| 0 ||  || MBA-O || 16.8 || 2.4 km || multiple || 2004–2020 || 02 Apr 2020 || 58 || align=left | Disc.: SpacewatchAdded on 22 July 2020 || 
|- id="2004 FM71" bgcolor=#fefefe
| 0 ||  || MBA-I || 19.15 || data-sort-value="0.44" | 440 m || multiple || 2004–2022 || 25 Jan 2022 || 30 || align=left | Disc.: SpacewatchAdded on 17 January 2021Alt.: 2015 DZ277 || 
|- id="2004 FZ71" bgcolor=#d6d6d6
| 0 ||  || MBA-O || 17.1 || 2.1 km || multiple || 2004–2020 || 26 Mar 2020 || 41 || align=left | Disc.: SpacewatchAlt.: 2009 BA129 || 
|- id="2004 FO72" bgcolor=#E9E9E9
| 0 ||  || MBA-M || 17.2 || 2.0 km || multiple || 2004–2020 || 12 Sep 2020 || 61 || align=left | Disc.: Spacewatch || 
|- id="2004 FQ72" bgcolor=#E9E9E9
| 0 ||  || MBA-M || 17.1 || 2.1 km || multiple || 2004–2020 || 17 Dec 2020 || 70 || align=left | Disc.: Spacewatch || 
|- id="2004 FO73" bgcolor=#E9E9E9
| 1 ||  || MBA-M || 18.83 || data-sort-value="0.72" | 720 m || multiple || 2004–2021 || 31 Mar 2021 || 36 || align=left | Disc.: Spacewatch || 
|- id="2004 FR73" bgcolor=#d6d6d6
| 0 ||  || MBA-O || 17.24 || 2.0 km || multiple || 2004–2021 || 08 Sep 2021 || 101 || align=left | Disc.: SpacewatchAlt.: 2016 QB64 || 
|- id="2004 FH74" bgcolor=#E9E9E9
| 1 ||  || MBA-M || 17.9 || data-sort-value="0.78" | 780 m || multiple || 2004–2020 || 22 Mar 2020 || 65 || align=left | Disc.: SpacewatchAlt.: 2016 EO44 || 
|- id="2004 FK74" bgcolor=#fefefe
| 4 ||  || MBA-I || 19.3 || data-sort-value="0.41" | 410 m || multiple || 2004–2018 || 23 Jan 2018 || 24 || align=left | Disc.: SpacewatchAdded on 21 August 2021 || 
|- id="2004 FO74" bgcolor=#fefefe
| 0 ||  || MBA-I || 18.0 || data-sort-value="0.75" | 750 m || multiple || 2004–2020 || 21 Sep 2020 || 84 || align=left | Disc.: SpacewatchAdded on 13 September 2020Alt.: 2015 BA340 || 
|- id="2004 FX74" bgcolor=#E9E9E9
| 0 ||  || MBA-M || 18.16 || data-sort-value="0.69" | 690 m || multiple || 2000–2021 || 05 Jul 2021 || 45 || align=left | Disc.: SpacewatchAdded on 17 June 2021 || 
|- id="2004 FY75" bgcolor=#E9E9E9
| 0 ||  || MBA-M || 17.4 || 1.4 km || multiple || 2004–2021 || 14 Jan 2021 || 58 || align=left | Disc.: Spacewatch || 
|- id="2004 FG76" bgcolor=#d6d6d6
| 0 ||  || MBA-O || 16.62 || 2.6 km || multiple || 2001–2021 || 09 Apr 2021 || 136 || align=left | Disc.: SpacewatchAlt.: 2010 GL112, 2015 CW59, 2016 LQ13 || 
|- id="2004 FH76" bgcolor=#d6d6d6
| 0 ||  || MBA-O || 16.5 || 3.2 km || multiple || 2004–2019 || 03 Dec 2019 || 72 || align=left | Disc.: SpacewatchAlt.: 2010 NC85 || 
|- id="2004 FM76" bgcolor=#fefefe
| 0 ||  || MBA-I || 18.4 || data-sort-value="0.62" | 620 m || multiple || 2004–2021 || 15 Jun 2021 || 67 || align=left | Disc.: SpacewatchAlt.: 2015 UE12 || 
|- id="2004 FW76" bgcolor=#fefefe
| 0 ||  || MBA-I || 18.27 || data-sort-value="0.66" | 660 m || multiple || 2004–2021 || 14 Apr 2021 || 111 || align=left | Disc.: LINEARAlt.: 2011 FE8, 2011 HE34 || 
|- id="2004 FD78" bgcolor=#E9E9E9
| 0 ||  || MBA-M || 17.8 || 1.5 km || multiple || 2004–2020 || 20 Oct 2020 || 31 || align=left | Disc.: LPL/Spacewatch II || 
|- id="2004 FE78" bgcolor=#E9E9E9
| 1 ||  || MBA-M || 18.2 || data-sort-value="0.96" | 960 m || multiple || 2004–2021 || 15 Apr 2021 || 40 || align=left | Disc.: LPL/Spacewatch IIAdded on 5 November 2021Alt.: 2008 DG7, 2017 HH15 || 
|- id="2004 FH78" bgcolor=#E9E9E9
| 0 ||  || MBA-M || 17.25 || 2.0 km || multiple || 2004–2022 || 27 Jan 2022 || 101 || align=left | Disc.: LPL/Spacewatch II || 
|- id="2004 FJ78" bgcolor=#E9E9E9
| – ||  || MBA-M || 17.7 || 1.6 km || single || 7 days || 26 Mar 2004 || 9 || align=left | Disc.: LPL/Spacewatch II || 
|- id="2004 FO78" bgcolor=#fefefe
| 0 ||  || MBA-I || 18.48 || data-sort-value="0.60" | 600 m || multiple || 2004–2021 || 17 Apr 2021 || 68 || align=left | Disc.: LPL/Spacewatch IIAlt.: 2008 OL14 || 
|- id="2004 FQ78" bgcolor=#d6d6d6
| – ||  || MBA-O || 19.3 || data-sort-value="0.77" | 770 m || single || 7 days || 26 Mar 2004 || 9 || align=left | Disc.: LPL/Spacewatch II || 
|- id="2004 FY78" bgcolor=#fefefe
| 2 ||  || MBA-I || 18.7 || data-sort-value="0.54" | 540 m || multiple || 2004–2019 || 02 Jun 2019 || 27 || align=left | Disc.: LPL/Spacewatch II || 
|- id="2004 FD79" bgcolor=#E9E9E9
| 0 ||  || MBA-M || 16.8 || 2.4 km || multiple || 1992–2021 || 05 Jan 2021 || 104 || align=left | Disc.: SpacewatchAlt.: 1992 SK11, 2015 VT82 || 
|- id="2004 FE79" bgcolor=#d6d6d6
| – ||  || MBA-O || 17.5 || 1.8 km || single || 10 days || 29 Mar 2004 || 9 || align=left | Disc.: LPL/Spacewatch II || 
|- id="2004 FK79" bgcolor=#d6d6d6
| 0 ||  || MBA-O || 16.9 || 2.3 km || multiple || 2004–2021 || 13 Jun 2021 || 89 || align=left | Disc.: LPL/Spacewatch II || 
|- id="2004 FW79" bgcolor=#E9E9E9
| 0 ||  || MBA-M || 17.69 || data-sort-value="0.86" | 860 m || multiple || 2000–2021 || 30 Jul 2021 || 103 || align=left | Disc.: LINEAR || 
|- id="2004 FB80" bgcolor=#d6d6d6
| 0 ||  || MBA-O || 17.2 || 2.0 km || multiple || 2004–2020 || 22 Mar 2020 || 58 || align=left | Disc.: LPL/Spacewatch II || 
|- id="2004 FN80" bgcolor=#E9E9E9
| 0 ||  || MBA-M || 17.5 || 1.8 km || multiple || 2004–2020 || 15 Dec 2020 || 64 || align=left | Disc.: LINEAR || 
|- id="2004 FG84" bgcolor=#d6d6d6
| 0 ||  || MBA-O || 16.96 || 2.3 km || multiple || 2004–2021 || 31 Jul 2021 || 128 || align=left | Disc.: SpacewatchAlt.: 2010 DJ55 || 
|- id="2004 FJ84" bgcolor=#fefefe
| 0 ||  || MBA-I || 17.5 || data-sort-value="0.94" | 940 m || multiple || 2004–2019 || 24 Oct 2019 || 92 || align=left | Disc.: SpacewatchAlt.: 2018 ER6 || 
|- id="2004 FL84" bgcolor=#fefefe
| 0 ||  || MBA-I || 17.5 || data-sort-value="0.94" | 940 m || multiple || 2004–2021 || 11 Jan 2021 || 156 || align=left | Disc.: Spacewatch || 
|- id="2004 FK85" bgcolor=#E9E9E9
| 0 ||  || MBA-M || 17.47 || 1.3 km || multiple || 2004–2021 || 08 May 2021 || 93 || align=left | Disc.: Spacewatch || 
|- id="2004 FD87" bgcolor=#d6d6d6
| 0 ||  || MBA-O || 16.30 || 3.1 km || multiple || 2004–2021 || 09 Jul 2021 || 222 || align=left | Disc.: NEATAlt.: 2009 AN51, 2013 YP29 || 
|- id="2004 FK87" bgcolor=#fefefe
| 0 ||  || MBA-I || 17.52 || data-sort-value="0.93" | 930 m || multiple || 2004–2021 || 06 May 2021 || 201 || align=left | Disc.: NEATAlt.: 2009 WU142, 2011 GY64 || 
|- id="2004 FQ89" bgcolor=#E9E9E9
| 0 ||  || MBA-M || 17.2 || 1.5 km || multiple || 2000–2021 || 13 May 2021 || 91 || align=left | Disc.: LINEARAdded on 17 June 2021Alt.: 2021 FG13 || 
|- id="2004 FD91" bgcolor=#fefefe
| 0 ||  || MBA-I || 17.7 || data-sort-value="0.86" | 860 m || multiple || 2004–2021 || 17 Jan 2021 || 114 || align=left | Disc.: SpacewatchAlt.: 2006 YU26 || 
|- id="2004 FB97" bgcolor=#d6d6d6
| 0 ||  || MBA-O || 15.60 || 4.2 km || multiple || 2004–2021 || 05 Dec 2021 || 180 || align=left | Disc.: LINEARAlt.: 2006 SB416, 2007 XV, 2009 EM21, 2010 ET6, 2015 JX10, 2019 AC29 || 
|- id="2004 FF98" bgcolor=#fefefe
| 0 ||  || MBA-I || 17.7 || data-sort-value="0.86" | 860 m || multiple || 2004–2020 || 14 Oct 2020 || 83 || align=left | Disc.: LINEARAlt.: 2015 DE108 || 
|- id="2004 FW98" bgcolor=#fefefe
| 0 ||  || MBA-I || 18.46 || data-sort-value="0.60" | 600 m || multiple || 2004–2021 || 11 Oct 2021 || 34 || align=left | Disc.: LPL/Spacewatch II || 
|- id="2004 FJ99" bgcolor=#E9E9E9
| 0 ||  || MBA-M || 17.9 || 1.1 km || multiple || 2004–2019 || 05 Nov 2019 || 46 || align=left | Disc.: LPL/Spacewatch II || 
|- id="2004 FB100" bgcolor=#E9E9E9
| 2 ||  || MBA-M || 18.2 || data-sort-value="0.96" | 960 m || multiple || 2004–2018 || 18 Aug 2018 || 39 || align=left | Disc.: LPL/Spacewatch II || 
|- id="2004 FM100" bgcolor=#fefefe
| 2 ||  || HUN || 19.4 || data-sort-value="0.39" | 390 m || multiple || 2004–2018 || 02 Oct 2018 || 31 || align=left | Disc.: LPL/Spacewatch II || 
|- id="2004 FT100" bgcolor=#E9E9E9
| 1 ||  || MBA-M || 17.7 || data-sort-value="0.86" | 860 m || multiple || 2004–2020 || 19 Jan 2020 || 45 || align=left | Disc.: LPL/Spacewatch II || 
|- id="2004 FC101" bgcolor=#E9E9E9
| 1 ||  || MBA-M || 17.93 || data-sort-value="0.77" | 770 m || multiple || 2004–2021 || 08 Jul 2021 || 33 || align=left | Disc.: LINEARAdded on 21 August 2021 || 
|- id="2004 FE103" bgcolor=#d6d6d6
| 0 ||  || MBA-O || 17.18 || 2.0 km || multiple || 2004–2021 || 10 May 2021 || 64 || align=left | Disc.: Spacewatch || 
|- id="2004 FF103" bgcolor=#E9E9E9
| 0 ||  || MBA-M || 18.37 || data-sort-value="0.89" | 890 m || multiple || 2004–2021 || 13 May 2021 || 86 || align=left | Disc.: Spacewatch || 
|- id="2004 FG103" bgcolor=#d6d6d6
| 0 ||  || MBA-O || 16.4 || 2.9 km || multiple || 1999–2021 || 16 Jan 2021 || 104 || align=left | Disc.: SpacewatchAlt.: 2016 GM101 || 
|- id="2004 FL103" bgcolor=#E9E9E9
| 3 ||  || MBA-M || 18.66 || data-sort-value="0.55" | 550 m || multiple || 2004–2017 || 30 Jul 2017 || 27 || align=left | Disc.: Spacewatch || 
|- id="2004 FD104" bgcolor=#E9E9E9
| 0 ||  || MBA-M || 18.0 || 1.1 km || multiple || 2004–2020 || 12 Dec 2020 || 93 || align=left | Disc.: Spacewatch || 
|- id="2004 FJ104" bgcolor=#fefefe
| 0 ||  || MBA-I || 18.1 || data-sort-value="0.71" | 710 m || multiple || 2004–2021 || 12 Jan 2021 || 81 || align=left | Disc.: SpacewatchAlt.: 2005 OZ29 || 
|- id="2004 FO104" bgcolor=#E9E9E9
| 0 ||  || MBA-M || 17.65 || 1.2 km || multiple || 2004–2021 || 06 May 2021 || 146 || align=left | Disc.: LINEAR || 
|- id="2004 FZ106" bgcolor=#fefefe
| 0 ||  || MBA-I || 17.59 || data-sort-value="0.90" | 900 m || multiple || 2004–2021 || 13 Apr 2021 || 134 || align=left | Disc.: LINEAR || 
|- id="2004 FQ109" bgcolor=#d6d6d6
| 0 ||  || MBA-O || 16.91 || 2.3 km || multiple || 2004–2021 || 13 Jul 2021 || 155 || align=left | Disc.: LONEOS || 
|- id="2004 FK112" bgcolor=#d6d6d6
| 0 ||  || MBA-O || 16.69 || 2.6 km || multiple || 2004–2021 || 14 Jun 2021 || 152 || align=left | Disc.: LINEARAlt.: 2015 DO219 || 
|- id="2004 FX112" bgcolor=#E9E9E9
| 0 ||  || MBA-M || 17.3 || 1.0 km || multiple || 2000–2020 || 24 Jan 2020 || 64 || align=left | Disc.: SpacewatchAdded on 21 August 2021Alt.: 2014 WZ346 || 
|- id="2004 FF113" bgcolor=#E9E9E9
| 0 ||  || MBA-M || 16.8 || 2.4 km || multiple || 2004–2020 || 10 Dec 2020 || 112 || align=left | Disc.: LINEARAlt.: 2014 ON83, 2015 TL177 || 
|- id="2004 FK113" bgcolor=#E9E9E9
| 0 ||  || MBA-M || 17.45 || 1.4 km || multiple || 2004–2021 || 16 May 2021 || 85 || align=left | Disc.: Spacewatch || 
|- id="2004 FL113" bgcolor=#d6d6d6
| 0 ||  || MBA-O || 16.3 || 3.1 km || multiple || 2004–2021 || 05 Jun 2021 || 131 || align=left | Disc.: Spacewatch || 
|- id="2004 FP113" bgcolor=#d6d6d6
| 0 ||  || MBA-O || 16.8 || 2.4 km || multiple || 2004–2020 || 20 Apr 2020 || 58 || align=left | Disc.: SpacewatchAlt.: 2015 HL112 || 
|- id="2004 FV113" bgcolor=#d6d6d6
| 0 ||  || MBA-O || 16.0 || 3.5 km || multiple || 2001–2021 || 14 Jun 2021 || 161 || align=left | Disc.: SpacewatchAlt.: 2010 OC143 || 
|- id="2004 FO114" bgcolor=#fefefe
| 0 ||  || MBA-I || 18.0 || data-sort-value="0.75" | 750 m || multiple || 2004–2021 || 12 Jan 2021 || 89 || align=left | Disc.: Spacewatch || 
|- id="2004 FY114" bgcolor=#fefefe
| 3 ||  || MBA-I || 18.7 || data-sort-value="0.54" | 540 m || multiple || 2004–2018 || 16 Mar 2018 || 35 || align=left | Disc.: Spacewatch || 
|- id="2004 FD119" bgcolor=#fefefe
| 2 ||  || MBA-I || 18.61 || data-sort-value="0.56" | 560 m || multiple || 2004–2021 || 09 Aug 2021 || 23 || align=left | Disc.: Spacewatch || 
|- id="2004 FU119" bgcolor=#fefefe
| 4 ||  || MBA-I || 18.9 || data-sort-value="0.49" | 490 m || multiple || 2004–2018 || 15 Jan 2018 || 19 || align=left | Disc.: LPL/Spacewatch II || 
|- id="2004 FW119" bgcolor=#E9E9E9
| 0 ||  || MBA-M || 17.43 || 1.4 km || multiple || 2004–2021 || 16 Apr 2021 || 39 || align=left | Disc.: SpacewatchAdded on 11 May 2021 || 
|- id="2004 FA120" bgcolor=#d6d6d6
| 0 ||  || MBA-O || 16.4 || 2.9 km || multiple || 2004–2020 || 21 May 2020 || 110 || align=left | Disc.: SpacewatchAlt.: 2010 DU97, 2013 YO136 || 
|- id="2004 FH120" bgcolor=#d6d6d6
| 0 ||  || MBA-O || 16.8 || 2.4 km || multiple || 2004–2020 || 23 Apr 2020 || 47 || align=left | Disc.: SpacewatchAlt.: 2012 TR201 || 
|- id="2004 FM120" bgcolor=#fefefe
| 0 ||  || MBA-I || 17.9 || data-sort-value="0.78" | 780 m || multiple || 1998–2019 || 23 Sep 2019 || 109 || align=left | Disc.: SpacewatchAlt.: 2015 FX336 || 
|- id="2004 FX122" bgcolor=#E9E9E9
| 0 ||  || MBA-M || 18.43 || data-sort-value="0.87" | 870 m || multiple || 2000–2021 || 10 May 2021 || 47 || align=left | Disc.: SpacewatchAdded on 11 May 2021 || 
|- id="2004 FY122" bgcolor=#d6d6d6
| 0 ||  || MBA-O || 16.51 || 2.8 km || multiple || 2004–2021 || 03 May 2021 || 77 || align=left | Disc.: Spacewatch || 
|- id="2004 FZ122" bgcolor=#E9E9E9
| 0 ||  || MBA-M || 17.95 || 1.1 km || multiple || 2000–2021 || 11 May 2021 || 75 || align=left | Disc.: SpacewatchAlt.: 2016 CW150 || 
|- id="2004 FA123" bgcolor=#fefefe
| 0 ||  || MBA-I || 17.5 || data-sort-value="0.94" | 940 m || multiple || 2004–2021 || 17 Jan 2021 || 149 || align=left | Disc.: LINEARAlt.: 2016 TG75 || 
|- id="2004 FP123" bgcolor=#d6d6d6
| 0 ||  || MBA-O || 17.7 || 1.6 km || multiple || 2004–2020 || 19 Apr 2020 || 26 || align=left | Disc.: SpacewatchAdded on 13 September 2020 || 
|- id="2004 FU123" bgcolor=#E9E9E9
| 0 ||  || MBA-M || 17.5 || 1.8 km || multiple || 2004–2021 || 07 Feb 2021 || 87 || align=left | Disc.: Kitt Peak Obs.Added on 30 September 2021Alt.: 2013 HS98 || 
|- id="2004 FQ124" bgcolor=#d6d6d6
| 0 ||  || MBA-O || 16.6 || 2.7 km || multiple || 2004–2020 || 22 Apr 2020 || 57 || align=left | Disc.: Spacewatch || 
|- id="2004 FC125" bgcolor=#E9E9E9
| 0 ||  || MBA-M || 16.6 || 2.0 km || multiple || 2004–2021 || 10 Jun 2021 || 176 || align=left | Disc.: LINEAR || 
|- id="2004 FP126" bgcolor=#fefefe
| 0 ||  || MBA-I || 18.5 || data-sort-value="0.59" | 590 m || multiple || 2004–2021 || 23 Jan 2021 || 55 || align=left | Disc.: LINEARAlt.: 2014 BJ51 || 
|- id="2004 FH127" bgcolor=#E9E9E9
| – ||  || MBA-M || 18.2 || data-sort-value="0.68" | 680 m || single || 25 days || 11 Apr 2004 || 17 || align=left | Disc.: LINEAR || 
|- id="2004 FM127" bgcolor=#fefefe
| 3 ||  || MBA-I || 18.7 || data-sort-value="0.54" | 540 m || multiple || 2004–2021 || 22 Apr 2021 || 19 || align=left | Disc.: LINEARAdded on 17 June 2021Alt.: 2021 GS45 || 
|- id="2004 FV128" bgcolor=#fefefe
| 0 ||  || MBA-I || 18.3 || data-sort-value="0.65" | 650 m || multiple || 2004–2020 || 11 Dec 2020 || 105 || align=left | Disc.: LPL/Spacewatch IIAlt.: 2011 EE33, 2015 KS43 || 
|- id="2004 FA129" bgcolor=#E9E9E9
| 0 ||  || MBA-M || 18.29 || data-sort-value="0.92" | 920 m || multiple || 2004–2021 || 11 Jun 2021 || 71 || align=left | Disc.: LPL/Spacewatch IIAdded on 17 June 2021Alt.: 2021 GS40 || 
|- id="2004 FC132" bgcolor=#fefefe
| 1 ||  || MBA-I || 18.5 || data-sort-value="0.59" | 590 m || multiple || 2004–2021 || 04 Jan 2021 || 128 || align=left | Disc.: SpacewatchAlt.: 2011 EH28 || 
|- id="2004 FE132" bgcolor=#d6d6d6
| 0 ||  || MBA-O || 17.2 || 2.0 km || multiple || 2004–2021 || 07 Jun 2021 || 70 || align=left | Disc.: SpacewatchAlt.: 2007 RX109 || 
|- id="2004 FP132" bgcolor=#fefefe
| 4 ||  || MBA-I || 18.9 || data-sort-value="0.49" | 490 m || multiple || 2004–2019 || 03 Apr 2019 || 29 || align=left | Disc.: SpacewatchAlt.: 2015 BN132 || 
|- id="2004 FF134" bgcolor=#fefefe
| 0 ||  || MBA-I || 18.53 || data-sort-value="0.58" | 580 m || multiple || 2004–2022 || 27 Jan 2022 || 75 || align=left | Disc.: LONEOSAlt.: 2015 HZ171 || 
|- id="2004 FJ135" bgcolor=#fefefe
| 0 ||  || HUN || 18.24 || data-sort-value="0.67" | 670 m || multiple || 1994–2021 || 27 Nov 2021 || 116 || align=left | Disc.: LINEAR || 
|- id="2004 FW135" bgcolor=#d6d6d6
| 0 ||  || MBA-O || 16.79 || 2.4 km || multiple || 2001–2021 || 06 Apr 2021 || 80 || align=left | Disc.: SpacewatchAdded on 11 May 2021 || 
|- id="2004 FR136" bgcolor=#E9E9E9
| 1 ||  || MBA-M || 17.6 || 1.3 km || multiple || 2004–2019 || 05 Nov 2019 || 54 || align=left | Disc.: SpacewatchAlt.: 2017 FZ78 || 
|- id="2004 FS136" bgcolor=#fefefe
| 0 ||  || HUN || 18.59 || data-sort-value="0.57" | 570 m || multiple || 2004–2021 || 30 Oct 2021 || 138 || align=left | Disc.: SpacewatchAlt.: 2013 RD40 || 
|- id="2004 FS137" bgcolor=#fefefe
| 0 ||  || MBA-I || 18.6 || data-sort-value="0.57" | 570 m || multiple || 2004–2017 || 17 Mar 2017 || 44 || align=left | Disc.: SpacewatchAlt.: 2017 DZ45 || 
|- id="2004 FT137" bgcolor=#E9E9E9
| 0 ||  || MBA-M || 17.2 || 2.0 km || multiple || 2001–2020 || 23 Nov 2020 || 134 || align=left | Disc.: SpacewatchAlt.: 2010 RU37 || 
|- id="2004 FV137" bgcolor=#d6d6d6
| 0 ||  || MBA-O || 17.32 || 1.9 km || multiple || 2004–2021 || 03 Oct 2021 || 54 || align=left | Disc.: SpacewatchAdded on 21 August 2021Alt.: 2009 FD94, 2013 BU13 || 
|- id="2004 FE138" bgcolor=#E9E9E9
| 0 ||  || MBA-M || 17.8 || 1.2 km || multiple || 2004–2021 || 09 May 2021 || 47 || align=left | Disc.: SpacewatchAdded on 17 June 2021Alt.: 2021 FN14 || 
|- id="2004 FA142" bgcolor=#fefefe
| 4 ||  || MBA-I || 18.9 || data-sort-value="0.49" | 490 m || multiple || 2004–2011 || 05 Mar 2011 || 25 || align=left | Disc.: LINEARAlt.: 2011 DE16 || 
|- id="2004 FL144" bgcolor=#d6d6d6
| 0 ||  || MBA-O || 16.74 || 2.5 km || multiple || 2004–2021 || 06 Apr 2021 || 74 || align=left | Disc.: SpacewatchAlt.: 2015 FR220 || 
|- id="2004 FM144" bgcolor=#fefefe
| 0 ||  || MBA-I || 18.4 || data-sort-value="0.62" | 620 m || multiple || 2000–2020 || 13 Sep 2020 || 65 || align=left | Disc.: SpacewatchAlt.: 2015 EU46 || 
|- id="2004 FZ144" bgcolor=#E9E9E9
| 0 ||  || MBA-M || 18.1 || data-sort-value="0.71" | 710 m || multiple || 2004–2020 || 22 Mar 2020 || 68 || align=left | Disc.: Spacewatch || 
|- id="2004 FT145" bgcolor=#fefefe
| 1 ||  || MBA-I || 17.6 || data-sort-value="0.90" | 900 m || multiple || 2004–2020 || 11 Dec 2020 || 36 || align=left | Disc.: Spacewatch || 
|- id="2004 FP146" bgcolor=#FA8072
| – ||  || MCA || 21.1 || data-sort-value="0.34" | 340 m || single || 9 days || 09 Apr 2004 || 8 || align=left | Disc.: LPL/Spacewatch II || 
|- id="2004 FM147" bgcolor=#E9E9E9
| 0 ||  || MBA-M || 16.49 || 2.1 km || multiple || 2002–2021 || 15 May 2021 || 143 || align=left | Disc.: LINEAR || 
|- id="2004 FU148" bgcolor=#C2E0FF
| 3 ||  || TNO || 7.42 || 155 km || multiple || 2004–2021 || 08 Jul 2021 || 96 || align=left | Disc.: Kitt Peak Obs.LoUTNOs, plutino || 
|- id="2004 FG149" bgcolor=#d6d6d6
| 0 ||  || MBA-O || 16.5 || 2.8 km || multiple || 2004–2020 || 02 Apr 2020 || 76 || align=left | Disc.: SpacewatchAdded on 22 July 2020 || 
|- id="2004 FY149" bgcolor=#d6d6d6
| 0 ||  || MBA-O || 16.22 || 3.2 km || multiple || 2004–2021 || 02 May 2021 || 118 || align=left | Disc.: Spacewatch || 
|- id="2004 FT150" bgcolor=#d6d6d6
| 0 ||  || MBA-O || 16.7 || 2.5 km || multiple || 2004–2021 || 05 Jun 2021 || 73 || align=left | Disc.: SpacewatchAdded on 17 June 2021Alt.: 2007 VC221 || 
|- id="2004 FC151" bgcolor=#fefefe
| 0 ||  || MBA-I || 18.3 || data-sort-value="0.65" | 650 m || multiple || 2004–2021 || 05 Jun 2021 || 111 || align=left | Disc.: Spacewatch || 
|- id="2004 FJ151" bgcolor=#fefefe
| 0 ||  || MBA-I || 18.59 || data-sort-value="0.57" | 570 m || multiple || 2004–2022 || 05 Jan 2022 || 70 || align=left | Disc.: SpacewatchAlt.: 2011 BC151 || 
|- id="2004 FH152" bgcolor=#d6d6d6
| 0 ||  || MBA-O || 16.5 || 2.8 km || multiple || 2004–2020 || 20 Apr 2020 || 94 || align=left | Disc.: SpacewatchAlt.: 2006 UR294, 2009 DJ7 || 
|- id="2004 FM152" bgcolor=#fefefe
| 0 ||  || MBA-I || 17.91 || data-sort-value="0.78" | 780 m || multiple || 2004–2021 || 15 Apr 2021 || 140 || align=left | Disc.: SpacewatchAlt.: 2012 TG222 || 
|- id="2004 FP152" bgcolor=#fefefe
| 1 ||  || MBA-I || 19.0 || data-sort-value="0.47" | 470 m || multiple || 2004–2019 || 09 Apr 2019 || 25 || align=left | Disc.: Spacewatch || 
|- id="2004 FT152" bgcolor=#d6d6d6
| 0 ||  || MBA-O || 17.12 || 2.1 km || multiple || 1999–2021 || 06 Nov 2021 || 129 || align=left | Disc.: Spacewatch || 
|- id="2004 FE153" bgcolor=#E9E9E9
| 0 ||  || MBA-M || 17.2 || 2.0 km || multiple || 2004–2019 || 25 Sep 2019 || 56 || align=left | Disc.: LPL/Spacewatch IIAlt.: 2013 FC1 || 
|- id="2004 FF153" bgcolor=#E9E9E9
| 0 ||  || MBA-M || 17.3 || 1.5 km || multiple || 2004–2021 || 15 Jan 2021 || 64 || align=left | Disc.: LPL/Spacewatch II || 
|- id="2004 FG153" bgcolor=#E9E9E9
| 0 ||  || MBA-M || 17.15 || 1.6 km || multiple || 2004–2021 || 08 Apr 2021 || 142 || align=left | Disc.: Junk Bond Obs.Alt.: 2014 QE58, 2017 HP6 || 
|- id="2004 FL153" bgcolor=#E9E9E9
| 0 ||  || MBA-M || 17.23 || 1.1 km || multiple || 2002–2021 || 08 May 2021 || 120 || align=left | Disc.: SpacewatchAlt.: 2010 MP11 || 
|- id="2004 FV153" bgcolor=#fefefe
| 0 ||  || MBA-I || 18.47 || data-sort-value="0.60" | 600 m || multiple || 2004–2022 || 09 Jan 2022 || 28 || align=left | Disc.: SpacewatchAlt.: 2015 FB23 || 
|- id="2004 FX153" bgcolor=#E9E9E9
| 0 ||  || MBA-M || 16.96 || 2.3 km || multiple || 2004–2022 || 12 Jan 2022 || 141 || align=left | Disc.: Spacewatch || 
|- id="2004 FA154" bgcolor=#d6d6d6
| 0 ||  || MBA-O || 17.15 || 2.1 km || multiple || 2000–2021 || 11 May 2021 || 102 || align=left | Disc.: SpacewatchAdded on 17 June 2021Alt.: 2010 BZ99, 2010 OV87, 2015 DB19, 2021 GQ37 || 
|- id="2004 FA155" bgcolor=#E9E9E9
| 0 ||  || MBA-M || 17.88 || data-sort-value="0.79" | 790 m || multiple || 2004–2021 || 03 May 2021 || 42 || align=left | Disc.: SpacewatchAdded on 11 May 2021 || 
|- id="2004 FB155" bgcolor=#E9E9E9
| 0 ||  || MBA-M || 18.40 || data-sort-value="0.88" | 880 m || multiple || 2001–2021 || 11 May 2021 || 60 || align=left | Disc.: Spacewatch || 
|- id="2004 FL155" bgcolor=#fefefe
| 0 ||  || MBA-I || 17.9 || data-sort-value="0.78" | 780 m || multiple || 1995–2020 || 12 Dec 2020 || 135 || align=left | Disc.: SpacewatchAlt.: 2006 WC128, 2013 SK7, 2013 TP92 || 
|- id="2004 FC156" bgcolor=#fefefe
| 0 ||  || MBA-I || 17.9 || data-sort-value="0.78" | 780 m || multiple || 2004–2020 || 05 Nov 2020 || 109 || align=left | Disc.: SpacewatchAlt.: 2011 BA50 || 
|- id="2004 FK156" bgcolor=#fefefe
| 0 ||  || MBA-I || 18.6 || data-sort-value="0.57" | 570 m || multiple || 2004–2020 || 14 Dec 2020 || 76 || align=left | Disc.: SpacewatchAdded on 19 October 2020Alt.: 2011 GD86 || 
|- id="2004 FA157" bgcolor=#E9E9E9
| 0 ||  || MBA-M || 16.89 || 2.3 km || multiple || 1992–2022 || 27 Jan 2022 || 159 || align=left | Disc.: SpacewatchAlt.: 2008 AS13, 2010 KO27, 2013 CX172 || 
|- id="2004 FL157" bgcolor=#d6d6d6
| 0 ||  || MBA-O || 16.6 || 2.7 km || multiple || 2004–2020 || 25 May 2020 || 75 || align=left | Disc.: SpacewatchAlt.: 2006 SZ177, 2015 FL301 || 
|- id="2004 FP157" bgcolor=#E9E9E9
| 0 ||  || MBA-M || 17.78 || 1.5 km || multiple || 2004–2022 || 08 Jan 2022 || 29 || align=left | Disc.: SpacewatchAdded on 22 July 2020Alt.: 2018 FM26 || 
|- id="2004 FV157" bgcolor=#E9E9E9
| 0 ||  || MBA-M || 17.10 || 2.1 km || multiple || 2004–2022 || 27 Jan 2022 || 47 || align=left | Disc.: SpacewatchAlt.: 2010 TL8 || 
|- id="2004 FZ157" bgcolor=#fefefe
| 0 ||  || MBA-I || 19.1 || data-sort-value="0.45" | 450 m || multiple || 2004–2015 || 22 May 2015 || 46 || align=left | Disc.: Spacewatch || 
|- id="2004 FJ158" bgcolor=#E9E9E9
| 0 ||  || MBA-M || 17.64 || 1.2 km || multiple || 2002–2021 || 07 Apr 2021 || 128 || align=left | Disc.: Spacewatch || 
|- id="2004 FD159" bgcolor=#fefefe
| 0 ||  || MBA-I || 18.50 || data-sort-value="0.59" | 590 m || multiple || 2004–2021 || 07 May 2021 || 42 || align=left | Disc.: SpacewatchAdded on 11 May 2021Alt.: 2011 HN50 || 
|- id="2004 FK159" bgcolor=#d6d6d6
| 0 ||  || MBA-O || 17.16 || 2.1 km || multiple || 2004–2021 || 14 May 2021 || 85 || align=left | Disc.: Spacewatch || 
|- id="2004 FQ160" bgcolor=#E9E9E9
| 0 ||  || MBA-M || 17.3 || 1.5 km || multiple || 2000–2021 || 12 Jan 2021 || 88 || align=left | Disc.: LINEAR || 
|- id="2004 FL161" bgcolor=#d6d6d6
| 0 ||  || MBA-O || 16.7 || 2.5 km || multiple || 2001–2021 || 11 Jun 2021 || 197 || align=left | Disc.: Spacewatch || 
|- id="2004 FP161" bgcolor=#E9E9E9
| 0 ||  || MBA-M || 17.66 || 1.2 km || multiple || 2004–2021 || 14 May 2021 || 90 || align=left | Disc.: LINEARAlt.: 2008 CX130 || 
|- id="2004 FS161" bgcolor=#fefefe
| 0 ||  || MBA-I || 18.49 || data-sort-value="0.60" | 600 m || multiple || 2004–2021 || 03 May 2021 || 55 || align=left | Disc.: Spacewatch || 
|- id="2004 FH162" bgcolor=#fefefe
| 1 ||  || MBA-I || 18.3 || data-sort-value="0.65" | 650 m || multiple || 2004–2019 || 06 Oct 2019 || 37 || align=left | Disc.: SpacewatchAdded on 22 July 2020 || 
|- id="2004 FL162" bgcolor=#E9E9E9
| 0 ||  || MBA-M || 17.0 || 1.2 km || multiple || 2004–2020 || 21 Apr 2020 || 164 || align=left | Disc.: SpacewatchAlt.: 2016 CL150, 2018 VX19 || 
|- id="2004 FO162" bgcolor=#E9E9E9
| 0 ||  || MBA-M || 17.4 || 1.4 km || multiple || 2004–2021 || 11 Jun 2021 || 77 || align=left | Disc.: SpacewatchAdded on 17 June 2021Alt.: 2021 GL39 || 
|- id="2004 FU162" bgcolor=#FFC2E0
| 9 ||  || ATE || 28.7 || data-sort-value="0.0065" | 7 m || single || 0 day || 31 Mar 2004 || 4 || align=left | Disc.: LINEAR || 
|- id="2004 FW164" bgcolor=#C2E0FF
| 2 ||  || TNO || 8.1 || 113 km || multiple || 2004–2019 || 06 May 2019 || 28 || align=left | Disc.: Mauna Kea Obs.LoUTNOs, plutino || 
|- id="2004 FV166" bgcolor=#fefefe
| 0 ||  || MBA-I || 17.9 || data-sort-value="0.78" | 780 m || multiple || 2004–2020 || 20 Oct 2020 || 122 || align=left | Disc.: Kitt Peak Obs. || 
|- id="2004 FZ166" bgcolor=#fefefe
| 0 ||  || MBA-I || 17.55 || data-sort-value="0.92" | 920 m || multiple || 2004–2021 || 05 May 2021 || 170 || align=left | Disc.: NEAT || 
|- id="2004 FC167" bgcolor=#fefefe
| 0 ||  || MBA-I || 17.83 || data-sort-value="0.81" | 810 m || multiple || 2004–2021 || 02 Oct 2021 || 121 || align=left | Disc.: Spacewatch || 
|- id="2004 FD167" bgcolor=#d6d6d6
| 0 ||  || MBA-O || 15.9 || 3.7 km || multiple || 2000–2020 || 21 Apr 2020 || 135 || align=left | Disc.: SDSS || 
|- id="2004 FE167" bgcolor=#fefefe
| 0 ||  || MBA-I || 17.5 || data-sort-value="0.94" | 940 m || multiple || 2004–2020 || 07 Dec 2020 || 160 || align=left | Disc.: Spacewatch || 
|- id="2004 FF167" bgcolor=#d6d6d6
| 0 ||  || MBA-O || 16.85 || 2.4 km || multiple || 2004–2021 || 31 Aug 2021 || 155 || align=left | Disc.: LPL/Spacewatch II || 
|- id="2004 FG167" bgcolor=#fefefe
| 0 ||  || MBA-I || 18.15 || data-sort-value="0.70" | 700 m || multiple || 2004–2021 || 12 May 2021 || 122 || align=left | Disc.: Spacewatch || 
|- id="2004 FH167" bgcolor=#fefefe
| 0 ||  || MBA-I || 17.8 || data-sort-value="0.82" | 820 m || multiple || 2004–2021 || 10 Jan 2021 || 111 || align=left | Disc.: Spacewatch || 
|- id="2004 FJ167" bgcolor=#fefefe
| 0 ||  || MBA-I || 18.31 || data-sort-value="0.65" | 650 m || multiple || 2004–2022 || 27 Jan 2022 || 109 || align=left | Disc.: Spacewatch || 
|- id="2004 FK167" bgcolor=#E9E9E9
| 0 ||  || MBA-M || 16.8 || 2.4 km || multiple || 2004–2020 || 06 Dec 2020 || 132 || align=left | Disc.: Spacewatch || 
|- id="2004 FL167" bgcolor=#fefefe
| 0 ||  || MBA-I || 18.0 || data-sort-value="0.75" | 750 m || multiple || 2004–2020 || 14 Nov 2020 || 101 || align=left | Disc.: Spacewatch || 
|- id="2004 FN167" bgcolor=#fefefe
| 0 ||  || MBA-I || 17.7 || data-sort-value="0.86" | 860 m || multiple || 2004–2020 || 14 Dec 2020 || 109 || align=left | Disc.: SpacewatchAlt.: 2013 XP13 || 
|- id="2004 FP167" bgcolor=#fefefe
| 1 ||  || HUN || 18.2 || data-sort-value="0.68" | 680 m || multiple || 2004–2020 || 13 Apr 2020 || 112 || align=left | Disc.: SDSS || 
|- id="2004 FQ167" bgcolor=#fefefe
| 0 ||  || MBA-I || 17.8 || data-sort-value="0.82" | 820 m || multiple || 2004–2020 || 20 Oct 2020 || 120 || align=left | Disc.: Spacewatch || 
|- id="2004 FS167" bgcolor=#E9E9E9
| 0 ||  || MBA-M || 17.2 || 1.5 km || multiple || 2004–2021 || 17 Jan 2021 || 112 || align=left | Disc.: Spacewatch || 
|- id="2004 FT167" bgcolor=#fefefe
| 0 ||  || MBA-I || 18.1 || data-sort-value="0.71" | 710 m || multiple || 2004–2020 || 03 Jan 2020 || 97 || align=left | Disc.: Spacewatch || 
|- id="2004 FV167" bgcolor=#fefefe
| 0 ||  || MBA-I || 17.5 || data-sort-value="0.94" | 940 m || multiple || 2004–2021 || 17 Jan 2021 || 89 || align=left | Disc.: Spacewatch || 
|- id="2004 FW167" bgcolor=#E9E9E9
| 0 ||  || MBA-M || 16.8 || 2.4 km || multiple || 2004–2021 || 05 Jan 2021 || 100 || align=left | Disc.: Spacewatch || 
|- id="2004 FX167" bgcolor=#d6d6d6
| 0 ||  || MBA-O || 17.00 || 2.2 km || multiple || 2004–2021 || 09 Aug 2021 || 82 || align=left | Disc.: Spacewatch || 
|- id="2004 FY167" bgcolor=#E9E9E9
| 0 ||  || MBA-M || 17.0 || 1.7 km || multiple || 2004–2021 || 07 Jun 2021 || 121 || align=left | Disc.: Spacewatch || 
|- id="2004 FA168" bgcolor=#fefefe
| 0 ||  || MBA-I || 18.24 || data-sort-value="0.67" | 670 m || multiple || 2004–2021 || 09 Aug 2021 || 137 || align=left | Disc.: Spacewatch || 
|- id="2004 FC168" bgcolor=#fefefe
| 0 ||  || MBA-I || 17.8 || data-sort-value="0.82" | 820 m || multiple || 1995–2021 || 24 Jan 2021 || 101 || align=left | Disc.: SDSS || 
|- id="2004 FE168" bgcolor=#E9E9E9
| 0 ||  || MBA-M || 17.67 || 1.2 km || multiple || 2004–2021 || 03 May 2021 || 76 || align=left | Disc.: Spacewatch || 
|- id="2004 FF168" bgcolor=#E9E9E9
| 0 ||  || MBA-M || 17.28 || 1.0 km || multiple || 2004–2021 || 07 Jul 2021 || 112 || align=left | Disc.: Spacewatch || 
|- id="2004 FG168" bgcolor=#d6d6d6
| 0 ||  || MBA-O || 16.4 || 2.9 km || multiple || 2004–2020 || 20 May 2020 || 99 || align=left | Disc.: Spacewatch || 
|- id="2004 FJ168" bgcolor=#d6d6d6
| 0 ||  || MBA-O || 16.0 || 3.5 km || multiple || 2004–2021 || 04 Jun 2021 || 136 || align=left | Disc.: SSSAlt.: 2010 BN88 || 
|- id="2004 FK168" bgcolor=#E9E9E9
| 0 ||  || MBA-M || 17.5 || 1.3 km || multiple || 2004–2021 || 17 Jan 2021 || 86 || align=left | Disc.: Spacewatch || 
|- id="2004 FL168" bgcolor=#E9E9E9
| 0 ||  || MBA-M || 17.33 || 1.4 km || multiple || 2004–2021 || 06 May 2021 || 90 || align=left | Disc.: SDSS || 
|- id="2004 FN168" bgcolor=#d6d6d6
| 0 ||  || MBA-O || 16.3 || 3.1 km || multiple || 2004–2020 || 16 May 2020 || 80 || align=left | Disc.: Spacewatch || 
|- id="2004 FO168" bgcolor=#fefefe
| 0 ||  || MBA-I || 18.3 || data-sort-value="0.65" | 650 m || multiple || 2004–2021 || 05 Jan 2021 || 105 || align=left | Disc.: LPL/Spacewatch II || 
|- id="2004 FQ168" bgcolor=#fefefe
| 0 ||  || MBA-I || 17.9 || data-sort-value="0.78" | 780 m || multiple || 2001–2018 || 07 Mar 2018 || 55 || align=left | Disc.: Spacewatch || 
|- id="2004 FT168" bgcolor=#E9E9E9
| 0 ||  || MBA-M || 16.8 || 1.3 km || multiple || 2004–2020 || 22 Apr 2020 || 86 || align=left | Disc.: LPL/Spacewatch II || 
|- id="2004 FU168" bgcolor=#fefefe
| 0 ||  || MBA-I || 18.7 || data-sort-value="0.54" | 540 m || multiple || 2004–2018 || 23 Jan 2018 || 59 || align=left | Disc.: LPL/Spacewatch II || 
|- id="2004 FV168" bgcolor=#fefefe
| 0 ||  || MBA-I || 17.9 || data-sort-value="0.78" | 780 m || multiple || 2004–2021 || 18 Jan 2021 || 101 || align=left | Disc.: LPL/Spacewatch II || 
|- id="2004 FW168" bgcolor=#E9E9E9
| 0 ||  || MBA-M || 17.46 || 1.4 km || multiple || 2004–2021 || 11 May 2021 || 90 || align=left | Disc.: Spacewatch || 
|- id="2004 FX168" bgcolor=#fefefe
| 0 ||  || MBA-I || 18.42 || data-sort-value="0.62" | 620 m || multiple || 2004–2021 || 28 Nov 2021 || 70 || align=left | Disc.: LPL/Spacewatch II || 
|- id="2004 FZ168" bgcolor=#d6d6d6
| 0 ||  || MBA-O || 16.9 || 2.3 km || multiple || 2004–2021 || 11 Oct 2021 || 111 || align=left | Disc.: LPL/Spacewatch II || 
|- id="2004 FA169" bgcolor=#d6d6d6
| 0 ||  || MBA-O || 16.29 || 3.1 km || multiple || 2004–2021 || 17 Apr 2021 || 77 || align=left | Disc.: Spacewatch || 
|- id="2004 FB169" bgcolor=#E9E9E9
| 0 ||  || MBA-M || 17.1 || 2.1 km || multiple || 2004–2018 || 16 Sep 2018 || 62 || align=left | Disc.: Spacewatch || 
|- id="2004 FD169" bgcolor=#E9E9E9
| 0 ||  || MBA-M || 17.1 || 2.1 km || multiple || 2004–2019 || 25 Sep 2019 || 64 || align=left | Disc.: Spacewatch || 
|- id="2004 FE169" bgcolor=#d6d6d6
| 0 ||  || MBA-O || 16.9 || 2.3 km || multiple || 2004–2020 || 22 Apr 2020 || 64 || align=left | Disc.: LPL/Spacewatch II || 
|- id="2004 FF169" bgcolor=#d6d6d6
| 0 ||  || MBA-O || 16.91 || 2.3 km || multiple || 2004–2021 || 02 May 2021 || 56 || align=left | Disc.: LPL/Spacewatch II || 
|- id="2004 FG169" bgcolor=#fefefe
| 0 ||  || MBA-I || 18.4 || data-sort-value="0.62" | 620 m || multiple || 2004–2020 || 14 Oct 2020 || 74 || align=left | Disc.: Spacewatch || 
|- id="2004 FH169" bgcolor=#fefefe
| 0 ||  || MBA-I || 18.3 || data-sort-value="0.65" | 650 m || multiple || 2004–2020 || 14 Dec 2020 || 67 || align=left | Disc.: Spacewatch || 
|- id="2004 FK169" bgcolor=#E9E9E9
| 0 ||  || MBA-M || 17.61 || 1.3 km || multiple || 2004–2021 || 06 May 2021 || 126 || align=left | Disc.: Spacewatch || 
|- id="2004 FL169" bgcolor=#fefefe
| 0 ||  || MBA-I || 18.8 || data-sort-value="0.52" | 520 m || multiple || 2004–2019 || 24 Oct 2019 || 46 || align=left | Disc.: Spacewatch || 
|- id="2004 FN169" bgcolor=#fefefe
| 0 ||  || MBA-I || 17.8 || data-sort-value="0.82" | 820 m || multiple || 2004–2020 || 15 Dec 2020 || 105 || align=left | Disc.: Spacewatch || 
|- id="2004 FO169" bgcolor=#fefefe
| 0 ||  || MBA-I || 18.3 || data-sort-value="0.65" | 650 m || multiple || 2004–2020 || 19 Aug 2020 || 65 || align=left | Disc.: LPL/Spacewatch II || 
|- id="2004 FR169" bgcolor=#fefefe
| 1 ||  || MBA-I || 18.6 || data-sort-value="0.57" | 570 m || multiple || 2004–2018 || 16 May 2018 || 74 || align=left | Disc.: LPL/Spacewatch IIAlt.: 2016 UJ175 || 
|- id="2004 FS169" bgcolor=#fefefe
| 0 ||  || MBA-I || 18.4 || data-sort-value="0.62" | 620 m || multiple || 2004–2019 || 27 Sep 2019 || 61 || align=left | Disc.: Spacewatch || 
|- id="2004 FT169" bgcolor=#fefefe
| 0 ||  || MBA-I || 18.5 || data-sort-value="0.59" | 590 m || multiple || 2004–2020 || 06 Dec 2020 || 58 || align=left | Disc.: Spacewatch || 
|- id="2004 FU169" bgcolor=#fefefe
| 0 ||  || MBA-I || 17.9 || data-sort-value="0.78" | 780 m || multiple || 2004–2020 || 23 Dec 2020 || 86 || align=left | Disc.: Spacewatch || 
|- id="2004 FW169" bgcolor=#fefefe
| 0 ||  || MBA-I || 18.41 || data-sort-value="0.62" | 620 m || multiple || 2001–2021 || 15 Apr 2021 || 99 || align=left | Disc.: Spacewatch || 
|- id="2004 FX169" bgcolor=#fefefe
| 0 ||  || MBA-I || 17.9 || data-sort-value="0.78" | 780 m || multiple || 2004–2021 || 11 Jan 2021 || 96 || align=left | Disc.: Spacewatch || 
|- id="2004 FY169" bgcolor=#E9E9E9
| 0 ||  || MBA-M || 17.6 || data-sort-value="0.90" | 900 m || multiple || 2004–2021 || 08 Jun 2021 || 96 || align=left | Disc.: Spacewatch || 
|- id="2004 FB170" bgcolor=#E9E9E9
| 0 ||  || MBA-M || 17.60 || 1.3 km || multiple || 2004–2021 || 02 Apr 2021 || 85 || align=left | Disc.: Spacewatch || 
|- id="2004 FD170" bgcolor=#fefefe
| 0 ||  || MBA-I || 18.0 || data-sort-value="0.75" | 750 m || multiple || 2004–2020 || 18 Dec 2020 || 69 || align=left | Disc.: Spacewatch || 
|- id="2004 FF170" bgcolor=#E9E9E9
| 0 ||  || MBA-M || 17.76 || 1.2 km || multiple || 2004–2021 || 01 May 2021 || 79 || align=left | Disc.: Spacewatch || 
|- id="2004 FG170" bgcolor=#fefefe
| 0 ||  || MBA-I || 18.9 || data-sort-value="0.49" | 490 m || multiple || 2004–2020 || 04 Jan 2020 || 52 || align=left | Disc.: Spacewatch || 
|- id="2004 FH170" bgcolor=#d6d6d6
| 0 ||  || MBA-O || 16.8 || 2.4 km || multiple || 2004–2020 || 15 May 2020 || 82 || align=left | Disc.: Spacewatch || 
|- id="2004 FJ170" bgcolor=#d6d6d6
| 0 ||  || MBA-O || 16.40 || 2.9 km || multiple || 2004–2021 || 13 May 2021 || 86 || align=left | Disc.: Spacewatch || 
|- id="2004 FL170" bgcolor=#fefefe
| 0 ||  || MBA-I || 17.9 || data-sort-value="0.78" | 780 m || multiple || 2004–2021 || 18 Jan 2021 || 74 || align=left | Disc.: LPL/Spacewatch II || 
|- id="2004 FM170" bgcolor=#E9E9E9
| 2 ||  || MBA-M || 18.1 || data-sort-value="0.71" | 710 m || multiple || 2004–2020 || 21 Apr 2020 || 65 || align=left | Disc.: Spacewatch || 
|- id="2004 FN170" bgcolor=#fefefe
| 0 ||  || MBA-I || 18.03 || data-sort-value="0.74" | 740 m || multiple || 2004–2021 || 18 Jan 2021 || 62 || align=left | Disc.: Spacewatch || 
|- id="2004 FO170" bgcolor=#E9E9E9
| 0 ||  || MBA-M || 17.85 || 1.1 km || multiple || 2000–2021 || 11 Apr 2021 || 73 || align=left | Disc.: Spacewatch || 
|- id="2004 FQ170" bgcolor=#E9E9E9
| 0 ||  || MBA-M || 17.26 || 1.0 km || multiple || 2004–2021 || 19 May 2021 || 70 || align=left | Disc.: Spacewatch || 
|- id="2004 FS170" bgcolor=#fefefe
| 0 ||  || MBA-I || 19.12 || data-sort-value="0.45" | 450 m || multiple || 2004–2021 || 29 Aug 2021 || 67 || align=left | Disc.: LPL/Spacewatch II || 
|- id="2004 FU170" bgcolor=#fefefe
| 2 ||  || MBA-I || 18.6 || data-sort-value="0.57" | 570 m || multiple || 2004–2015 || 21 Apr 2015 || 32 || align=left | Disc.: Spacewatch || 
|- id="2004 FV170" bgcolor=#E9E9E9
| 0 ||  || MBA-M || 17.28 || 1.0 km || multiple || 1998–2021 || 27 Oct 2021 || 92 || align=left | Disc.: Spacewatch || 
|- id="2004 FX170" bgcolor=#d6d6d6
| 0 ||  || MBA-O || 16.51 || 2.8 km || multiple || 2004–2021 || 11 May 2021 || 74 || align=left | Disc.: Spacewatch || 
|- id="2004 FY170" bgcolor=#fefefe
| 0 ||  || MBA-I || 18.41 || data-sort-value="0.62" | 620 m || multiple || 2004–2021 || 18 May 2021 || 69 || align=left | Disc.: Spacewatch || 
|- id="2004 FA171" bgcolor=#E9E9E9
| 0 ||  || MBA-M || 17.2 || 1.5 km || multiple || 2004–2020 || 23 Dec 2020 || 40 || align=left | Disc.: Spacewatch || 
|- id="2004 FB171" bgcolor=#d6d6d6
| 0 ||  || MBA-O || 16.46 || 2.8 km || multiple || 2004–2021 || 15 May 2021 || 99 || align=left | Disc.: SpacewatchAlt.: 2010 OX7, 2015 CE49 || 
|- id="2004 FD171" bgcolor=#fefefe
| 0 ||  || MBA-I || 18.6 || data-sort-value="0.57" | 570 m || multiple || 2004–2020 || 16 Nov 2020 || 126 || align=left | Disc.: Spacewatch || 
|- id="2004 FE171" bgcolor=#fefefe
| 0 ||  || MBA-I || 18.3 || data-sort-value="0.65" | 650 m || multiple || 2004–2020 || 23 Jan 2020 || 43 || align=left | Disc.: Spacewatch || 
|- id="2004 FF171" bgcolor=#E9E9E9
| 0 ||  || MBA-M || 17.05 || 1.6 km || multiple || 2004–2021 || 18 Apr 2021 || 99 || align=left | Disc.: Spacewatch || 
|- id="2004 FG171" bgcolor=#fefefe
| 0 ||  || MBA-I || 18.0 || data-sort-value="0.75" | 750 m || multiple || 2004–2019 || 25 Sep 2019 || 52 || align=left | Disc.: Spacewatch || 
|- id="2004 FH171" bgcolor=#fefefe
| 0 ||  || MBA-I || 18.34 || data-sort-value="0.64" | 640 m || multiple || 2004–2022 || 10 Jan 2022 || 58 || align=left | Disc.: Spacewatch || 
|- id="2004 FJ171" bgcolor=#fefefe
| 1 ||  || MBA-I || 18.6 || data-sort-value="0.57" | 570 m || multiple || 2004–2021 || 04 Jan 2021 || 39 || align=left | Disc.: Spacewatch || 
|- id="2004 FK171" bgcolor=#d6d6d6
| 0 ||  || MBA-O || 17.0 || 2.2 km || multiple || 1996–2020 || 22 Apr 2020 || 51 || align=left | Disc.: LPL/Spacewatch II || 
|- id="2004 FM171" bgcolor=#fefefe
| 1 ||  || MBA-I || 18.6 || data-sort-value="0.57" | 570 m || multiple || 2004–2020 || 17 Nov 2020 || 67 || align=left | Disc.: Spacewatch || 
|- id="2004 FP171" bgcolor=#fefefe
| 0 ||  || MBA-I || 18.1 || data-sort-value="0.71" | 710 m || multiple || 2004–2020 || 22 Sep 2020 || 61 || align=left | Disc.: Spacewatch || 
|- id="2004 FQ171" bgcolor=#E9E9E9
| 0 ||  || MBA-M || 18.49 || data-sort-value="0.60" | 600 m || multiple || 2004–2021 || 04 Oct 2021 || 72 || align=left | Disc.: LPL/Spacewatch II || 
|- id="2004 FR171" bgcolor=#d6d6d6
| 0 ||  || MBA-O || 16.8 || 2.4 km || multiple || 2004–2021 || 04 Jul 2021 || 92 || align=left | Disc.: Spacewatch || 
|- id="2004 FS171" bgcolor=#fefefe
| 2 ||  || MBA-I || 18.9 || data-sort-value="0.49" | 490 m || multiple || 2004–2018 || 19 Mar 2018 || 33 || align=left | Disc.: Spacewatch || 
|- id="2004 FT171" bgcolor=#E9E9E9
| 0 ||  || MBA-M || 18.04 || 1.0 km || multiple || 2004–2021 || 31 Mar 2021 || 58 || align=left | Disc.: Spacewatch || 
|- id="2004 FU171" bgcolor=#E9E9E9
| 0 ||  || MBA-M || 18.55 || data-sort-value="0.58" | 580 m || multiple || 2004–2021 || 07 Sep 2021 || 49 || align=left | Disc.: LPL/Spacewatch II || 
|- id="2004 FV171" bgcolor=#fefefe
| 2 ||  || MBA-I || 18.5 || data-sort-value="0.59" | 590 m || multiple || 1997–2020 || 11 Nov 2020 || 40 || align=left | Disc.: SpacewatchAlt.: 1997 HQ15 || 
|- id="2004 FW171" bgcolor=#E9E9E9
| 2 ||  || MBA-M || 18.3 || data-sort-value="0.65" | 650 m || multiple || 2004–2016 || 04 Feb 2016 || 29 || align=left | Disc.: Spacewatch || 
|- id="2004 FZ171" bgcolor=#fefefe
| 0 ||  || MBA-I || 18.00 || data-sort-value="0.75" | 750 m || multiple || 2004–2022 || 06 Jan 2022 || 86 || align=left | Disc.: Spacewatch || 
|- id="2004 FA172" bgcolor=#fefefe
| 0 ||  || MBA-I || 18.93 || data-sort-value="0.49" | 490 m || multiple || 2004–2021 || 11 Jul 2021 || 74 || align=left | Disc.: Spacewatch || 
|- id="2004 FB172" bgcolor=#fefefe
| 0 ||  || MBA-I || 18.68 || data-sort-value="0.55" | 550 m || multiple || 2004–2022 || 09 Jan 2022 || 39 || align=left | Disc.: Spacewatch || 
|- id="2004 FC172" bgcolor=#fefefe
| 2 ||  || MBA-I || 18.9 || data-sort-value="0.49" | 490 m || multiple || 2004–2018 || 26 Jan 2018 || 33 || align=left | Disc.: LPL/Spacewatch II || 
|- id="2004 FD172" bgcolor=#fefefe
| 0 ||  || MBA-I || 18.68 || data-sort-value="0.55" | 550 m || multiple || 2004–2021 || 11 Nov 2021 || 32 || align=left | Disc.: LPL/Spacewatch II || 
|- id="2004 FE172" bgcolor=#E9E9E9
| 1 ||  || MBA-M || 17.5 || 1.8 km || multiple || 2004–2020 || 11 Dec 2020 || 60 || align=left | Disc.: Spacewatch || 
|- id="2004 FF172" bgcolor=#fefefe
| 0 ||  || HUN || 18.93 || data-sort-value="0.49" | 490 m || multiple || 2004–2021 || 09 Sep 2021 || 30 || align=left | Disc.: Spacewatch || 
|- id="2004 FG172" bgcolor=#fefefe
| 2 ||  || MBA-I || 18.8 || data-sort-value="0.52" | 520 m || multiple || 2004–2018 || 23 Jan 2018 || 28 || align=left | Disc.: Spacewatch || 
|- id="2004 FH172" bgcolor=#fefefe
| 0 ||  || MBA-I || 18.9 || data-sort-value="0.49" | 490 m || multiple || 2004–2020 || 10 Dec 2020 || 35 || align=left | Disc.: Spacewatch || 
|- id="2004 FJ172" bgcolor=#E9E9E9
| 1 ||  || MBA-M || 17.8 || 1.2 km || multiple || 2004–2021 || 18 Jan 2021 || 40 || align=left | Disc.: Spacewatch || 
|- id="2004 FK172" bgcolor=#fefefe
| 1 ||  || HUN || 18.9 || data-sort-value="0.49" | 490 m || multiple || 2004–2020 || 14 Jan 2020 || 31 || align=left | Disc.: SDSS || 
|- id="2004 FL172" bgcolor=#fefefe
| 2 ||  || MBA-I || 18.4 || data-sort-value="0.62" | 620 m || multiple || 2004–2019 || 05 Jul 2019 || 28 || align=left | Disc.: Spacewatch || 
|- id="2004 FM172" bgcolor=#E9E9E9
| 0 ||  || MBA-M || 16.5 || 1.5 km || multiple || 2004–2021 || 08 Jun 2021 || 153 || align=left | Disc.: LPL/Spacewatch II || 
|- id="2004 FN172" bgcolor=#d6d6d6
| 0 ||  || MBA-O || 16.71 || 2.5 km || multiple || 2004–2021 || 06 Oct 2021 || 195 || align=left | Disc.: SDSS || 
|- id="2004 FO172" bgcolor=#fefefe
| 0 ||  || MBA-I || 18.44 || data-sort-value="0.61" | 610 m || multiple || 2004–2021 || 13 May 2021 || 102 || align=left | Disc.: LPL/Spacewatch II || 
|- id="2004 FP172" bgcolor=#fefefe
| 0 ||  || MBA-I || 17.5 || data-sort-value="0.94" | 940 m || multiple || 2004–2020 || 17 Nov 2020 || 96 || align=left | Disc.: NEAT || 
|- id="2004 FQ172" bgcolor=#fefefe
| 0 ||  || MBA-I || 18.0 || data-sort-value="0.75" | 750 m || multiple || 2004–2020 || 20 Oct 2020 || 78 || align=left | Disc.: LPL/Spacewatch II || 
|- id="2004 FV172" bgcolor=#d6d6d6
| 0 ||  || MBA-O || 16.60 || 2.7 km || multiple || 2004–2021 || 01 May 2021 || 106 || align=left | Disc.: SDSS || 
|- id="2004 FW172" bgcolor=#E9E9E9
| 0 ||  || MBA-M || 17.3 || 1.9 km || multiple || 2004–2019 || 24 Oct 2019 || 56 || align=left | Disc.: LPL/Spacewatch II || 
|- id="2004 FX172" bgcolor=#d6d6d6
| 0 ||  || MBA-O || 16.69 || 2.6 km || multiple || 2004–2021 || 02 Oct 2021 || 101 || align=left | Disc.: LPL/Spacewatch IIAlt.: 2017 WY37 || 
|- id="2004 FY172" bgcolor=#d6d6d6
| 0 ||  || MBA-O || 16.54 || 2.7 km || multiple || 1996–2021 || 08 May 2021 || 110 || align=left | Disc.: Spacewatch || 
|- id="2004 FZ172" bgcolor=#d6d6d6
| 0 ||  || MBA-O || 16.73 || 2.5 km || multiple || 2004–2021 || 30 May 2021 || 95 || align=left | Disc.: Spacewatch || 
|- id="2004 FB173" bgcolor=#E9E9E9
| 0 ||  || MBA-M || 17.2 || 2.0 km || multiple || 2004–2020 || 10 Dec 2020 || 67 || align=left | Disc.: Spacewatch || 
|- id="2004 FC173" bgcolor=#E9E9E9
| 0 ||  || MBA-M || 17.59 || 1.7 km || multiple || 2004–2022 || 12 Jan 2022 || 63 || align=left | Disc.: Spacewatch || 
|- id="2004 FE173" bgcolor=#fefefe
| 0 ||  || MBA-I || 18.6 || data-sort-value="0.57" | 570 m || multiple || 2004–2019 || 27 May 2019 || 58 || align=left | Disc.: Spacewatch || 
|- id="2004 FF173" bgcolor=#fefefe
| 0 ||  || MBA-I || 17.9 || data-sort-value="0.78" | 780 m || multiple || 2004–2019 || 28 Sep 2019 || 59 || align=left | Disc.: Spacewatch || 
|- id="2004 FH173" bgcolor=#fefefe
| 0 ||  || MBA-I || 18.7 || data-sort-value="0.54" | 540 m || multiple || 2004–2020 || 19 Jan 2020 || 58 || align=left | Disc.: Spacewatch || 
|- id="2004 FJ173" bgcolor=#d6d6d6
| 0 ||  || MBA-O || 16.2 || 3.2 km || multiple || 2004–2021 || 15 Jan 2021 || 66 || align=left | Disc.: LPL/Spacewatch II || 
|- id="2004 FK173" bgcolor=#fefefe
| 0 ||  || MBA-I || 17.6 || data-sort-value="0.90" | 900 m || multiple || 2004–2020 || 10 Dec 2020 || 79 || align=left | Disc.: Spacewatch || 
|- id="2004 FL173" bgcolor=#fefefe
| 0 ||  || MBA-I || 18.53 || data-sort-value="0.58" | 580 m || multiple || 1994–2021 || 12 May 2021 || 80 || align=left | Disc.: Spacewatch || 
|- id="2004 FN173" bgcolor=#d6d6d6
| 0 ||  || MBA-O || 16.67 || 2.6 km || multiple || 2004–2021 || 08 Apr 2021 || 75 || align=left | Disc.: Spacewatch || 
|- id="2004 FO173" bgcolor=#d6d6d6
| 0 ||  || MBA-O || 17.19 || 2.0 km || multiple || 2004–2021 || 27 Nov 2021 || 101 || align=left | Disc.: Spacewatch || 
|- id="2004 FR173" bgcolor=#fefefe
| 0 ||  || MBA-I || 18.53 || data-sort-value="0.58" | 580 m || multiple || 2004–2022 || 27 Jan 2022 || 57 || align=left | Disc.: LPL/Spacewatch IIAlt.: 2004 GL6, 2004 GC92 || 
|- id="2004 FS173" bgcolor=#fefefe
| 0 ||  || MBA-I || 18.73 || data-sort-value="0.53" | 530 m || multiple || 2004–2022 || 27 Jan 2022 || 58 || align=left | Disc.: Spacewatch || 
|- id="2004 FU173" bgcolor=#d6d6d6
| 0 ||  || MBA-O || 16.35 || 3.0 km || multiple || 2000–2021 || 31 Mar 2021 || 91 || align=left | Disc.: Spacewatch || 
|- id="2004 FW173" bgcolor=#fefefe
| 0 ||  || MBA-I || 18.66 || data-sort-value="0.55" | 550 m || multiple || 2004–2021 || 10 Sep 2021 || 90 || align=left | Disc.: LPL/Spacewatch II || 
|- id="2004 FX173" bgcolor=#fefefe
| 0 ||  || MBA-I || 18.86 || data-sort-value="0.50" | 500 m || multiple || 2004–2022 || 25 Jan 2022 || 56 || align=left | Disc.: LPL/Spacewatch IIAlt.: 2015 DQ278 || 
|- id="2004 FY173" bgcolor=#fefefe
| 0 ||  || MBA-I || 18.1 || data-sort-value="0.71" | 710 m || multiple || 1995–2021 || 11 Jan 2021 || 128 || align=left | Disc.: SpacewatchAlt.: 1995 SV14 || 
|- id="2004 FZ173" bgcolor=#fefefe
| 0 ||  || MBA-I || 18.4 || data-sort-value="0.62" | 620 m || multiple || 2004–2019 || 24 Oct 2019 || 48 || align=left | Disc.: Spacewatch || 
|- id="2004 FA174" bgcolor=#E9E9E9
| 0 ||  || MBA-M || 18.00 || data-sort-value="0.75" | 750 m || multiple || 2004–2021 || 12 May 2021 || 51 || align=left | Disc.: SDSS || 
|- id="2004 FB174" bgcolor=#d6d6d6
| 0 ||  || MBA-O || 17.29 || 1.9 km || multiple || 2004–2021 || 03 Oct 2021 || 53 || align=left | Disc.: Spacewatch || 
|- id="2004 FC174" bgcolor=#E9E9E9
| 0 ||  || MBA-M || 18.0 || 1.4 km || multiple || 2004–2019 || 03 Oct 2019 || 143 || align=left | Disc.: Mauna Kea Obs.Alt.: 2004 BB123 || 
|- id="2004 FD174" bgcolor=#fefefe
| 0 ||  || MBA-I || 18.3 || data-sort-value="0.65" | 650 m || multiple || 2004–2021 || 06 Jan 2021 || 92 || align=left | Disc.: LPL/Spacewatch II || 
|- id="2004 FE174" bgcolor=#d6d6d6
| 0 ||  || MBA-O || 16.6 || 2.7 km || multiple || 2004–2021 || 07 Oct 2021 || 97 || align=left | Disc.: LPL/Spacewatch II || 
|- id="2004 FF174" bgcolor=#E9E9E9
| 0 ||  || MBA-M || 17.73 || 1.2 km || multiple || 2004–2021 || 06 Apr 2021 || 63 || align=left | Disc.: Spacewatch || 
|- id="2004 FG174" bgcolor=#E9E9E9
| 0 ||  || MBA-M || 17.5 || 1.8 km || multiple || 2004–2020 || 19 Oct 2020 || 46 || align=left | Disc.: Spacewatch || 
|- id="2004 FJ174" bgcolor=#E9E9E9
| 0 ||  || MBA-M || 17.6 || 1.7 km || multiple || 2004–2019 || 26 Nov 2019 || 39 || align=left | Disc.: LPL/Spacewatch II || 
|- id="2004 FK174" bgcolor=#d6d6d6
| 0 ||  || MBA-O || 16.8 || 2.4 km || multiple || 2004–2020 || 24 Mar 2020 || 42 || align=left | Disc.: Spacewatch || 
|- id="2004 FL174" bgcolor=#fefefe
| 0 ||  || MBA-I || 18.20 || data-sort-value="0.68" | 680 m || multiple || 1996–2022 || 06 Jan 2022 || 142 || align=left | Disc.: SpacewatchAlt.: 2006 VQ123 || 
|- id="2004 FN174" bgcolor=#d6d6d6
| 0 ||  || MBA-O || 17.28 || 1.9 km || multiple || 1999–2021 || 07 Nov 2021 || 52 || align=left | Disc.: SDSSAlt.: 1999 FF85 || 
|- id="2004 FO174" bgcolor=#E9E9E9
| 0 ||  || MBA-M || 17.27 || 1.5 km || multiple || 2004–2021 || 12 May 2021 || 96 || align=left | Disc.: Spacewatch || 
|- id="2004 FP174" bgcolor=#fefefe
| 0 ||  || MBA-I || 18.13 || data-sort-value="0.70" | 700 m || multiple || 2004–2021 || 26 Oct 2021 || 50 || align=left | Disc.: Spacewatch || 
|- id="2004 FQ174" bgcolor=#fefefe
| 0 ||  || MBA-I || 18.80 || data-sort-value="0.52" | 520 m || multiple || 2004–2021 || 31 Aug 2021 || 41 || align=left | Disc.: LPL/Spacewatch II || 
|- id="2004 FR174" bgcolor=#d6d6d6
| 0 ||  || HIL || 16.2 || 3.2 km || multiple || 2004–2020 || 25 May 2020 || 59 || align=left | Disc.: Spacewatch || 
|- id="2004 FS174" bgcolor=#E9E9E9
| 0 ||  || MBA-M || 17.2 || 1.5 km || multiple || 2004–2019 || 18 Sep 2019 || 38 || align=left | Disc.: Spacewatch || 
|- id="2004 FT174" bgcolor=#d6d6d6
| 0 ||  || MBA-O || 16.9 || 2.3 km || multiple || 2004–2019 || 04 Feb 2019 || 35 || align=left | Disc.: La Silla Obs. || 
|- id="2004 FU174" bgcolor=#fefefe
| 0 ||  || MBA-I || 18.24 || data-sort-value="0.67" | 670 m || multiple || 2004–2021 || 11 May 2021 || 64 || align=left | Disc.: Spacewatch || 
|- id="2004 FV174" bgcolor=#fefefe
| 0 ||  || MBA-I || 18.98 || data-sort-value="0.48" | 480 m || multiple || 2004–2021 || 06 Oct 2021 || 69 || align=left | Disc.: Spacewatch || 
|- id="2004 FX174" bgcolor=#fefefe
| 0 ||  || MBA-I || 18.80 || data-sort-value="0.52" | 520 m || multiple || 2004–2022 || 25 Jan 2022 || 45 || align=left | Disc.: LPL/Spacewatch II || 
|- id="2004 FY174" bgcolor=#fefefe
| 0 ||  || MBA-I || 18.6 || data-sort-value="0.57" | 570 m || multiple || 2004–2020 || 10 Dec 2020 || 77 || align=left | Disc.: Spacewatch || 
|- id="2004 FA175" bgcolor=#E9E9E9
| 0 ||  || MBA-M || 18.14 || data-sort-value="0.70" | 700 m || multiple || 2004–2021 || 13 Jul 2021 || 63 || align=left | Disc.: Spacewatch || 
|- id="2004 FB175" bgcolor=#fefefe
| 1 ||  || MBA-I || 18.6 || data-sort-value="0.57" | 570 m || multiple || 2004–2018 || 12 Jul 2018 || 33 || align=left | Disc.: Spacewatch || 
|- id="2004 FC175" bgcolor=#d6d6d6
| 0 ||  || MBA-O || 17.16 || 2.1 km || multiple || 1994–2021 || 30 Sep 2021 || 69 || align=left | Disc.: Spacewatch || 
|- id="2004 FD175" bgcolor=#fefefe
| 0 ||  || MBA-I || 18.70 || data-sort-value="0.54" | 540 m || multiple || 2004–2021 || 02 May 2021 || 48 || align=left | Disc.: LPL/Spacewatch II || 
|- id="2004 FE175" bgcolor=#fefefe
| 1 ||  || MBA-I || 18.9 || data-sort-value="0.49" | 490 m || multiple || 2004–2021 || 18 Jan 2021 || 42 || align=left | Disc.: Spacewatch || 
|- id="2004 FF175" bgcolor=#fefefe
| 0 ||  || MBA-I || 18.3 || data-sort-value="0.65" | 650 m || multiple || 2004–2020 || 11 Nov 2020 || 34 || align=left | Disc.: Spacewatch || 
|- id="2004 FG175" bgcolor=#fefefe
| 0 ||  || MBA-I || 18.5 || data-sort-value="0.59" | 590 m || multiple || 2004–2018 || 23 Jan 2018 || 38 || align=left | Disc.: Spacewatch || 
|- id="2004 FH175" bgcolor=#fefefe
| 1 ||  || HUN || 18.5 || data-sort-value="0.59" | 590 m || multiple || 2004–2018 || 19 Nov 2018 || 29 || align=left | Disc.: Spacewatch || 
|- id="2004 FJ175" bgcolor=#d6d6d6
| 0 ||  || MBA-O || 16.13 || 3.3 km || multiple || 2004–2021 || 12 May 2021 || 82 || align=left | Disc.: LPL/Spacewatch IIAlt.: 2010 PT65 || 
|- id="2004 FK175" bgcolor=#fefefe
| 0 ||  || MBA-I || 18.1 || data-sort-value="0.71" | 710 m || multiple || 2004–2019 || 04 Sep 2019 || 170 || align=left | Disc.: Spacewatch || 
|- id="2004 FL175" bgcolor=#fefefe
| 0 ||  || MBA-I || 18.2 || data-sort-value="0.68" | 680 m || multiple || 2004–2019 || 04 Sep 2019 || 138 || align=left | Disc.: LPL/Spacewatch IIAlt.: 2016 US223 || 
|- id="2004 FN175" bgcolor=#fefefe
| 0 ||  || MBA-I || 17.9 || data-sort-value="0.78" | 780 m || multiple || 2004–2021 || 18 Jan 2021 || 103 || align=left | Disc.: Spacewatch || 
|- id="2004 FP175" bgcolor=#d6d6d6
| 0 ||  || MBA-O || 16.71 || 2.5 km || multiple || 2004–2021 || 24 Nov 2021 || 129 || align=left | Disc.: Spacewatch || 
|- id="2004 FQ175" bgcolor=#d6d6d6
| 0 ||  || MBA-O || 17.16 || 2.1 km || multiple || 2004–2021 || 30 Nov 2021 || 121 || align=left | Disc.: Spacewatch || 
|- id="2004 FS175" bgcolor=#E9E9E9
| 0 ||  || MBA-M || 17.2 || 2.0 km || multiple || 2004–2019 || 03 Oct 2019 || 60 || align=left | Disc.: LPL/Spacewatch II || 
|- id="2004 FT175" bgcolor=#d6d6d6
| 0 ||  || MBA-O || 17.1 || 2.1 km || multiple || 2004–2020 || 26 Apr 2020 || 72 || align=left | Disc.: Spacewatch || 
|- id="2004 FV175" bgcolor=#d6d6d6
| 0 ||  || MBA-O || 17.8 || 1.5 km || multiple || 2004–2019 || 03 Jun 2019 || 126 || align=left | Disc.: LPL/Spacewatch IIAlt.: 2016 UK172 || 
|- id="2004 FX175" bgcolor=#d6d6d6
| 0 ||  || MBA-O || 17.21 || 2.0 km || multiple || 2004–2021 || 10 Aug 2021 || 132 || align=left | Disc.: Spacewatch || 
|- id="2004 FY175" bgcolor=#fefefe
| 0 ||  || MBA-I || 18.3 || data-sort-value="0.65" | 650 m || multiple || 2004–2019 || 05 Nov 2019 || 49 || align=left | Disc.: Spacewatch || 
|- id="2004 FA176" bgcolor=#fefefe
| 0 ||  || MBA-I || 18.4 || data-sort-value="0.62" | 620 m || multiple || 2004–2019 || 05 Aug 2019 || 61 || align=left | Disc.: Spacewatch || 
|- id="2004 FB176" bgcolor=#d6d6d6
| 0 ||  || HIL || 15.8 || 3.9 km || multiple || 2004–2020 || 17 May 2020 || 68 || align=left | Disc.: Spacewatch || 
|- id="2004 FD176" bgcolor=#fefefe
| 0 ||  || MBA-I || 18.0 || data-sort-value="0.75" | 750 m || multiple || 2004–2020 || 07 Dec 2020 || 94 || align=left | Disc.: Spacewatch || 
|- id="2004 FE176" bgcolor=#fefefe
| 1 ||  || MBA-I || 18.4 || data-sort-value="0.62" | 620 m || multiple || 2004–2019 || 08 Feb 2019 || 38 || align=left | Disc.: Spacewatch || 
|- id="2004 FF176" bgcolor=#fefefe
| 0 ||  || MBA-I || 18.6 || data-sort-value="0.57" | 570 m || multiple || 2004–2020 || 15 Oct 2020 || 48 || align=left | Disc.: Spacewatch || 
|- id="2004 FG176" bgcolor=#d6d6d6
| 0 ||  || MBA-O || 17.3 || 1.9 km || multiple || 2004–2020 || 20 May 2020 || 45 || align=left | Disc.: LPL/Spacewatch II || 
|- id="2004 FH176" bgcolor=#E9E9E9
| 0 ||  || MBA-M || 17.70 || 1.6 km || multiple || 2004–2022 || 24 Jan 2022 || 51 || align=left | Disc.: Spacewatch || 
|- id="2004 FJ176" bgcolor=#E9E9E9
| 0 ||  || MBA-M || 17.7 || 1.6 km || multiple || 2004–2020 || 16 Nov 2020 || 38 || align=left | Disc.: LPL/Spacewatch II || 
|- id="2004 FK176" bgcolor=#fefefe
| 1 ||  || MBA-I || 19.1 || data-sort-value="0.45" | 450 m || multiple || 2004–2019 || 01 Jun 2019 || 33 || align=left | Disc.: Spacewatch || 
|- id="2004 FL176" bgcolor=#E9E9E9
| 0 ||  || MBA-M || 17.4 || 1.8 km || multiple || 2004–2020 || 23 Oct 2020 || 47 || align=left | Disc.: Spacewatch || 
|- id="2004 FM176" bgcolor=#d6d6d6
| 0 ||  || MBA-O || 17.47 || 1.8 km || multiple || 1994–2021 || 17 Aug 2021 || 44 || align=left | Disc.: Spacewatch || 
|- id="2004 FN176" bgcolor=#fefefe
| 0 ||  || MBA-I || 18.6 || data-sort-value="0.57" | 570 m || multiple || 2004–2019 || 05 Aug 2019 || 40 || align=left | Disc.: LPL/Spacewatch II || 
|- id="2004 FO176" bgcolor=#E9E9E9
| 0 ||  || MBA-M || 18.68 || data-sort-value="0.77" | 770 m || multiple || 2004–2021 || 08 May 2021 || 57 || align=left | Disc.: Kitt Peak Obs. || 
|- id="2004 FR176" bgcolor=#d6d6d6
| 0 ||  || HIL || 15.6 || 4.2 km || multiple || 2004–2021 || 14 Jun 2021 || 95 || align=left | Disc.: Spacewatch || 
|- id="2004 FS176" bgcolor=#fefefe
| 0 ||  || MBA-I || 19.09 || data-sort-value="0.45" | 450 m || multiple || 2004–2021 || 08 Sep 2021 || 57 || align=left | Disc.: Spacewatch || 
|- id="2004 FT176" bgcolor=#E9E9E9
| 0 ||  || MBA-M || 17.48 || 1.8 km || multiple || 2004–2022 || 27 Jan 2022 || 59 || align=left | Disc.: Spacewatch || 
|- id="2004 FU176" bgcolor=#d6d6d6
| 0 ||  || MBA-O || 16.7 || 2.5 km || multiple || 2004–2021 || 16 Jan 2021 || 56 || align=left | Disc.: SDSS || 
|- id="2004 FV176" bgcolor=#fefefe
| 0 ||  || MBA-I || 18.0 || data-sort-value="0.75" | 750 m || multiple || 2004–2021 || 07 Jan 2021 || 64 || align=left | Disc.: Spacewatch || 
|- id="2004 FX176" bgcolor=#E9E9E9
| 0 ||  || MBA-M || 17.5 || 1.3 km || multiple || 2004–2019 || 26 Sep 2019 || 31 || align=left | Disc.: LPL/Spacewatch II || 
|- id="2004 FY176" bgcolor=#E9E9E9
| 0 ||  || MBA-M || 17.97 || data-sort-value="0.76" | 760 m || multiple || 2004–2021 || 19 May 2021 || 47 || align=left | Disc.: Spacewatch || 
|- id="2004 FC177" bgcolor=#d6d6d6
| 0 ||  || MBA-O || 16.57 || 2.7 km || multiple || 2004–2021 || 09 Jun 2021 || 100 || align=left | Disc.: SpacewatchAlt.: 2010 BR70, 2010 NS108 || 
|- id="2004 FD177" bgcolor=#d6d6d6
| 0 ||  || MBA-O || 16.1 || 3.4 km || multiple || 2004–2020 || 22 Dec 2020 || 56 || align=left | Disc.: SDSS || 
|- id="2004 FE177" bgcolor=#fefefe
| 2 ||  || MBA-I || 18.2 || data-sort-value="0.68" | 680 m || multiple || 2004–2019 || 27 Oct 2019 || 49 || align=left | Disc.: Spacewatch || 
|- id="2004 FF177" bgcolor=#d6d6d6
| 0 ||  || MBA-O || 16.67 || 2.6 km || multiple || 2004–2021 || 08 Apr 2021 || 75 || align=left | Disc.: Spacewatch || 
|- id="2004 FG177" bgcolor=#d6d6d6
| 0 ||  || MBA-O || 17.15 || 2.1 km || multiple || 2004–2021 || 01 May 2021 || 62 || align=left | Disc.: Spacewatch || 
|- id="2004 FH177" bgcolor=#fefefe
| 0 ||  || MBA-I || 18.37 || data-sort-value="0.63" | 630 m || multiple || 2004–2021 || 02 Apr 2021 || 58 || align=left | Disc.: Spacewatch || 
|- id="2004 FJ177" bgcolor=#d6d6d6
| 0 ||  || MBA-O || 17.12 || 2.1 km || multiple || 2004–2021 || 31 May 2021 || 76 || align=left | Disc.: LPL/Spacewatch II || 
|- id="2004 FK177" bgcolor=#E9E9E9
| 0 ||  || MBA-M || 18.01 || data-sort-value="0.74" | 740 m || multiple || 2004–2021 || 14 May 2021 || 64 || align=left | Disc.: SDSS || 
|- id="2004 FL177" bgcolor=#fefefe
| 0 ||  || MBA-I || 18.44 || data-sort-value="0.61" | 610 m || multiple || 2004–2021 || 14 Apr 2021 || 81 || align=left | Disc.: Spacewatch || 
|- id="2004 FM177" bgcolor=#d6d6d6
| 0 ||  || MBA-O || 16.95 || 2.3 km || multiple || 2004–2021 || 11 May 2021 || 48 || align=left | Disc.: Spacewatch || 
|- id="2004 FN177" bgcolor=#d6d6d6
| 0 ||  || MBA-O || 16.73 || 2.5 km || multiple || 2004–2021 || 19 Apr 2021 || 62 || align=left | Disc.: Spacewatch || 
|- id="2004 FP177" bgcolor=#E9E9E9
| 0 ||  || MBA-M || 17.5 || 1.3 km || multiple || 2004–2020 || 22 Nov 2020 || 50 || align=left | Disc.: Spacewatch || 
|- id="2004 FQ177" bgcolor=#E9E9E9
| 0 ||  || MBA-M || 17.91 || 1.1 km || multiple || 2004–2021 || 03 May 2021 || 49 || align=left | Disc.: Spacewatch || 
|- id="2004 FR177" bgcolor=#E9E9E9
| 0 ||  || MBA-M || 17.50 || 1.3 km || multiple || 2004–2021 || 17 Apr 2021 || 50 || align=left | Disc.: SpacewatchAlt.: 2005 TP50 || 
|- id="2004 FT177" bgcolor=#fefefe
| 0 ||  || MBA-I || 18.99 || data-sort-value="0.47" | 470 m || multiple || 2004–2021 || 01 Oct 2021 || 60 || align=left | Disc.: SpacewatchAdded on 22 July 2020 || 
|- id="2004 FU177" bgcolor=#fefefe
| 0 ||  || MBA-I || 17.9 || data-sort-value="0.78" | 780 m || multiple || 2004–2020 || 17 Dec 2020 || 60 || align=left | Disc.: SpacewatchAdded on 22 July 2020 || 
|- id="2004 FV177" bgcolor=#fefefe
| 1 ||  || MBA-I || 19.0 || data-sort-value="0.47" | 470 m || multiple || 2004–2020 || 24 Jun 2020 || 61 || align=left | Disc.: SpacewatchAdded on 13 September 2020 || 
|- id="2004 FX177" bgcolor=#E9E9E9
| 1 ||  || MBA-M || 18.30 || 1.2 km || multiple || 2004–2021 || 02 Dec 2021 || 33 || align=left | Disc.: SpacewatchAdded on 17 January 2021 || 
|- id="2004 FY177" bgcolor=#FA8072
| 1 ||  || HUN || 18.4 || data-sort-value="0.62" | 620 m || multiple || 2004–2020 || 17 Dec 2020 || 58 || align=left | Disc.: SDSSAdded on 17 January 2021 || 
|- id="2004 FA178" bgcolor=#d6d6d6
| 0 ||  || MBA-O || 17.5 || 1.8 km || multiple || 2004–2020 || 12 May 2020 || 30 || align=left | Disc.: SpacewatchAdded on 9 March 2021 || 
|- id="2004 FB178" bgcolor=#E9E9E9
| 0 ||  || MBA-M || 18.20 || data-sort-value="0.96" | 960 m || multiple || 2002–2021 || 06 May 2021 || 40 || align=left | Disc.: SpacewatchAdded on 11 May 2021 || 
|- id="2004 FC178" bgcolor=#d6d6d6
| 0 ||  || MBA-O || 16.99 || 2.2 km || multiple || 2004–2021 || 08 May 2021 || 77 || align=left | Disc.: SpacewatchAdded on 11 May 2021Alt.: 2010 ON124 || 
|- id="2004 FD178" bgcolor=#d6d6d6
| 1 ||  || MBA-O || 17.3 || 1.9 km || multiple || 2004–2021 || 08 May 2021 || 64 || align=left | Disc.: SDSSAdded on 11 May 2021Alt.: 2010 BE113 || 
|- id="2004 FE178" bgcolor=#fefefe
| 0 ||  || MBA-I || 18.25 || data-sort-value="0.67" | 670 m || multiple || 2004–2021 || 03 May 2021 || 70 || align=left | Disc.: SpacewatchAdded on 11 May 2021 || 
|- id="2004 FF178" bgcolor=#d6d6d6
| 0 ||  || MBA-O || 16.6 || 2.7 km || multiple || 2001–2021 || 07 Jun 2021 || 90 || align=left | Disc.: LPL/Spacewatch IIAdded on 11 May 2021Alt.: 2010 PM18 || 
|- id="2004 FG178" bgcolor=#E9E9E9
| 1 ||  || MBA-M || 18.1 || 1.0 km || multiple || 2004–2021 || 01 Jun 2021 || 39 || align=left | Disc.: SDSSAdded on 11 May 2021 || 
|- id="2004 FH178" bgcolor=#E9E9E9
| 1 ||  || MBA-M || 18.07 || 1.0 km || multiple || 2004–2021 || 31 Jul 2021 || 54 || align=left | Disc.: SpacewatchAdded on 11 May 2021 || 
|- id="2004 FM178" bgcolor=#fefefe
| 0 ||  || HUN || 18.45 || data-sort-value="0.61" | 610 m || multiple || 2004–2021 || 27 Nov 2021 || 91 || align=left | Disc.: SpacewatchAdded on 5 November 2021 || 
|}
back to top

References 
 

Lists of unnumbered minor planets